The Texas Longhorns men's basketball team represents the University of Texas at Austin in NCAA Division I intercollegiate men's basketball. The Longhorns currently compete in the Big 12 Conference.

The University of Texas began varsity intercollegiate competition in men's basketball in 1906. The Longhorns rank 17th in total victories among all NCAA Division I college basketball programs and 27th in all-time win percentage among programs with at least 60 years in Division I, with an all-time win–loss record of 1828–1105. Among Big 12 Conference men's basketball programs, Texas is second only to Kansas in both all-time wins and all-time win percentage.

The Longhorns have won 28 total conference championships in men's basketball and have made 35 total appearances in the NCAA tournament (11th-most appearances all time, with a 35–38 overall record), reaching the NCAA Final Four three times (1943, 1947, 2003) and the NCAA regional finals (Elite Eight) seven times. As of the end of the 2019–20 season, Texas ranks sixth among all Division I men's basketball programs for total NCAA Tournament games won without having won the national championship (35), trailing Kansas State (37), Notre Dame (38), Illinois (40), Oklahoma (42), and Purdue (42).

The Texas basketball program experienced substantial success during the early decades of its existence, but its success in the modern era is of relatively recent vintage. After two losing seasons during the program's first five years, Texas suffered only one losing season from 1912 to 1950, achieving a winning percentage of .703 during that span, reaching two Final Fours and one Elite Eight during the first decade of the NCAA Tournament, and receiving retroactive recognition as the 1933 national champion from the Premo-Porretta Power Poll. From 1951 to 1988, the Longhorns finished with losing records 14 times, recorded a winning percentage of .522, and participated in the expanded Tournament only five times. Texas achieved some measure of national recognition during the tenures of head coaches Abe Lemons (1976–82) and Tom Penders (1988–98), but the program rose to its highest level of prominence under the direction of former head coach Rick Barnes (1998–2015). Barnes guided Texas to 16 NCAA tournament appearances in his 17 seasons with the program, including a school-record 14 consecutive appearances (1999–2012), as well as fifteen 20-win seasons overall and a school-best 13 consecutive 20-win seasons (2000–12).

The team now plays in their new home arena, the Moody Center. The team is coached on an interim basis by Rodney Terry, who took over from Chris Beard after the latter was suspended and later fired after being arrested on a domestic violence charge.

History

The early years (1906–36)

1906–13

The Texas men's basketball program began in 1906 under the direction of Scotland native Magnus Mainland, a graduate engineering student and lineman for the Texas football team who organized, coached, and played on the university's first varsity basketball team. Mainland had been a nationally known basketball player as an undergraduate student at Wheaton College (Illinois) prior to coming to UT. His Wheaton team placed second out of the three competing college basketball teams in the 1904 Summer Olympics in St. Louis, the first Olympic Games featuring the young sport (although only as a demonstration sport). Mainland was able to persuade the University Athletic Council to set aside $125 for the preparation of an outdoor basketball court on the southwest corner of Clark Field—the stadium then hosting the Texas football, baseball, and track teams—and to let him organize, coach, and play on the university's first varsity basketball team.

The Longhorns took the court for the first time on March 10, 1906, defeating the Baylor Bears 27–17 on their new outdoor home court at Clark Field. Texas traveled to Waco two weeks later for a three-game series with the Bears (also in their first year) and won all three games behind the play of Mainland. The Longhorns ultimately won seven of the eight games scheduled in the basketball program's inaugural season.

Due to inadequate funding, the UT Athletic Council canceled the fledgling program after two seasons, leaving Texas without a basketball team for the 1908 season. The Athletics Council revived the program in 1909, owing in large part to the efforts of Longhorn player Morgan Vining, who campaigned to raise student interest in the game. Vining was supported in his efforts by the UT student newspaper, The Daily Texan, which consistently advocated for the reinstatement of basketball—in part because the game was viewed as good physical training for football players in the latter sport's offseason. 

Language professor, German native, and Longhorn football head coach W. E. Metzenthin (1909–11), who had argued strongly against the cancellation of basketball at UT, assumed head coaching duties for three seasons following the re-establishment of the program. The Longhorns played just 10 of their 27 games under Metzenthin (and only four of their final 18) on their home court, outdoor Clark Field—with its stubbornly uneven surface and total vulnerability to weather conditions—being particularly ill-suited as a basketball venue. Metzenthin finished with an overall record of 13–14; not until 1959 would another UT basketball coach leave with a losing overall record. After Metzenthin relinquished coaching duties following the 1911 season in order to serve as UT Athletic Council chairman (precursor to the athletic director position), former Texas track coach J. Burton Rix—coaching without financial compensation, just as had his two predecessors—led Texas to a 5–1 record in his single season as head coach (1912).

Professor Carl C. Taylor, also the Texas track coach, assumed basketball head coaching responsibilities for the 1913 season. Taylor arranged for the rental of the theater of the Ben Hur Temple and its conversion into a miniature basketball court and arena so that his team would have an indoor venue for home games and practice, with UT paying the Shriners and Scottish Rite Freemasons a sum of $75 for the season. Taylor came to UT with a strong reputation for basketball expertise, acquired during his years at Drake University. His Texas team finished with an overall record of 8–4 and, beginning with a 70–7 rout of Southwestern in San Marcos, contributed the first three victories to what would become a national-record winning streak. At the conclusion of the 1912–13 academic year, the UT's Cactus yearbook declared, "Basketball is no longer a minor sport at the University of Texas. It always has been so considered until this year Prof. Carl Taylor took charge of the work and infused new life into it."

1914–27

L. Theo Bellmont, the first athletic director at The University of Texas—and a man instrumental in the formation of the Southwest Conference—took the reins as head coach from 1914 to 1915, for the first of his two stints leading the basketball team, and directed the Longhorns to 11–0 and 14–0 records in the 1914 and 1915 seasons, respectively, as well as the inaugural Southwest Conference championship during the latter season. Bellmont's teams contributed 25 victories to a winning streak that would ultimately grow to 44 games.

After his teams extended the UT winning streak to 28 games, Bellmont stepped away from coaching to focus on his work as athletic director and appointed Roy Henderson to the still-unpaid Texas basketball head coaching position. Henderson's team recorded Texas' third consecutive undefeated season in 1916 to extend the total to 40 consecutive victories. Senior center Clyde Littlefield, the linchpin of the three consecutive undefeated teams—and a towering figure in UT athletics history who would later coach the football team for seven seasons (1927–33), serve as the head coach of the UT track team from 1925 to 1960 (winning 25 conference championships), and found the Texas Relays—would later receive retroactive recognition as Texas' first consensus All-American in basketball for his play in the 1916 season.

UT alumnus and former regent Thomas Watt Gregory had begun campaigning a decade earlier for the construction of a permanent gymnasium for the benefit of the student body and faculty—one in which the basketball team would be able to play and practice as well—but fundraising for the $75,000 project had lagged, even more so with Gregory's departure from Austin to serve as the U.S. Attorney General under Woodrow Wilson in 1914. The project was shelved, but the need remained acute, and, following the 1916 season, the UT Athletic Council decided to allocate $8,500 for the construction of the temporary and rudimentary all-wood Men's Gym, which was finished for the second game of the next season.

 
Theo Bellmont hired Eugene Van Gent from Missouri in 1916 to lead the Texas football, basketball, and track programs. Van Gent's single basketball team at Texas recorded a 13–3 overall mark and won the Southwest Conference championship for the third consecutive year, with the season highlighted by the first-ever basketball games between Texas and the Texas A&M Aggies, following the resumption of athletic relations between the two schools. The Longhorns began the basketball rivalry with wins in both home games and in one of two games in College Station. Van Gent's 1917 Texas team also added the final four wins to the Texas winning streak that had begun in 1913 before suffering a 24–18 loss to Rice in Austin. Texas' winning streak stood as the NCAA record for consecutive wins in men's basketball for almost 40 years (until Phil Woolpert's Bill Russell-led San Francisco teams won 60 consecutive games from 1955 to 1957), and the achievement today remains the fifth-longest winning streak in Division I history. Van Gent departed after coaching for one season in each sport—winning the conference championship in both—to join the military following the United States' entry into the First World War in April 1917.

Following Van Gent's single year as head coach, Roy Henderson returned to coach Texas for two additional seasons. With several players from the 1917 team having left for military service, the 1918 Longhorn basketball team had only one returning player in sophomore Al DeViney. Henderson scouted talent in the intramural ranks and nonetheless assembled a team that finished 14–5 overall and missed winning Texas' fourth consecutive SWC championship by a single game. Henderson guided the Longhorns to a 17–3 overall record in his final season (1919), splitting the four-game series with the second-place Aggies to win the SWC championship—Texas' fourth basketball conference championship during the five years the conference had existed.

 
From 1910 through 1919, Texas recorded an overall winning percentage of .789. Only three NCAA schools—California, Navy, and Wisconsin—achieved higher winning percentages for that decade.

Eugene Van Gent was set to return as head coach for the 1920 season but resigned before the beginning of the season to pursue a business opportunity in California. Berry M. Whitaker—who had come to the university to develop and direct one of the nation's first intramural programs, and who would also coach the Texas football team for the next three seasons—agreed to serve as head coach for the season. Texas, with seven returning lettermen and war veterans who had played in 1916 and 1917, was once again expected to contend for the conference championship in 1920, but seven players missed significant parts of the season due to injury and illness. After winning their first five games, the Longhorns lost six of eleven to finish at 10–6 overall—Texas' worst season in nine years.

Theo Bellmont designated Whitaker as the Longhorn football head coach after the departure of Bill Juneau, and Bellmont himself would assume basketball head coaching duties for two more seasons (1921 and 1922), finishing with a 13–5 overall record in 1921. Bellmont then led Texas to its first 20-win season during his final year. The Longhorns finished 20–4 overall and 14–4 in conference play in 1922. Missing five players to injury and grades in the latter part of the season, including the SWC's leading scorer in Phillip Peyton, Texas nonetheless entered its final game with a chance to win the SWC championship for the first time since 1919. The Longhorns fell short in College Station against the Aggies, then coached by future Texas football head coach and Athletic Director Dana X. Bible, who claimed their third consecutive SWC championship. Bellmont returned to his administrative responsibilities for good following the 1922 season, finishing his basketball coaching career with a 58–9 overall record; his .866 winning percentage remains the highest of any coach in program history.

Bellmont selected football assistant coach Milton Romney as the next head basketball coach—then still an unpaid position. Romney's tenure took an early inauspicious turn when the Longhorns lost at home to Oklahoma A&M, 28–27, after Romney called his top players to the bench with a 14-point lead and nine minutes remaining. The Longhorns again suffered a disproportionate number of injuries, including the loss of two starters to a broken leg and a fractured skull resulting from a motorcycle accident. The protracted selection of E. J. "Doc" Stewart from Clemson University as the head football coach created further turmoil and distraction when newspapers reported that he would also be charged with leading the basketball team, thus rendering Romney a lame duck with seven games to play. Texas stumbled to an 11–7 finish, losing four of its final six games, but managing to close the season with a win over Bible's Aggies.

A medical school graduate, a piano enthusiast, a former sportswriter, a one-time automobile dealership owner, and a veteran football and basketball coach, Doc Stewart quickly became a popular figure across diverse segments of the university population. His oratory eloquence landed him an open job offer from the head of the UT English Department. After having coached the football team to an undefeated season, Stewart turned to implementing an entirely new style of basketball at Texas—one that emphasized ball movement and man-to-man defense and that essentially dispensed with the dribble altogether. Texas entered the season expected to finish third or fourth in conference play behind TCU, Oklahoma A&M, and possibly Texas A&M. Texas opened the season with a one-point win and two four-point wins over Southwestern—an opponent that had lost its previous six games against the Longhorns by an average of almost 20 points—leading to concern in the local newspapers. Contrary to prognostications, Texas opened the conference slate with two wins over Oklahoma A&M and sweeps of six other conference series to reach 14–0 in conference play, securing at least a share of the SWC championship with six games remaining, all away from Austin. The Longhorns next traveled more than 500 miles by train to open a long and bitter basketball rivalry with the Arkansas Razorbacks, then in their first year of competition in the sport, earning four- and 11-point wins in Fayetteville. Despite its unblemished record, Texas was still predicted to lose at least one game to the Aggies in College Station. The Longhorns instead managed 24–14 and 17–11 victories over the Aggies to finish as the last undefeated team in Texas and SWC history at 23–0. Senior guard Abb Curtis would later receive retroactive recognition for the 1924 season as UT's second-ever consensus first-team All-American in basketball.

Some have speculated that Stewart's devotion to his varied non-athletic interests was the root cause of his football and basketball teams' decline in performance over his tenure. Following the perfect 1924 season, Stewart's next three teams finished 17–8, 12–10, and 13–9. This slide—coupled with his football teams' similar decline in performance—resulted in the popular Stewart's controversial dismissal following the 1926–27 season.

1927–36

Excepting two strong seasons—one particularly noteworthy—Texas maintained this level of relatively unremarkable performance in basketball for the better part of the next decade. Texas won only a single SWC Championship during the next nine seasons—in the exceptional 22–1 season of 1932–33, for which the Longhorns were also retroactively awarded the Premo-Porretta Power Poll national championship (presently unclaimed by UT).

Fred Walker (1927–31) coached the Longhorns following E.J. Stewart's dismissal, producing a 51–30 combined record during his four-year stint as head coach. Walker led Texas to an 18–2 overall record and 10–2 conference record during his second season. He was terminated following the Longhorns' disappointing 9–15 season in his fourth year.

Ed Olle (1931–34), who had played for Texas under Stewart, coached Texas for three seasons after Walker's dismissal, leading the Longhorns to a 22–1 overall mark, a conference championship, and a retroactively awarded Premo-Porretta Power Poll national championship during his second year. During his third year, Olle signaled that he would resign at the end of the season and recommended that freshman team and assistant varsity coach Marty Karow take his place.

Karow (1934–36) would direct Texas to a combined 31–16 record over his two years as head coach. His relationship with Texas Athletic Director and Longhorn football head coach Jack Chevigny marked by increasing friction, Karow resigned as head coach in the summer of 1936 and was hired shortly thereafter as the baseball head coach for the United States Naval Academy.

Jack Gray & H. C. "Bully" Gilstrap era (1937–51)

Pre-war Jack Gray years (1937–42)

Only two seasons removed from his senior year at Texas, in which he earned consensus first-team All-American honors, and with only one year as an assistant coach with the Texas freshman team, the immensely popular Jack Gray was hired as the fourteenth Texas men's basketball head coach in the summer of 1937 at the age of 25.

After his first two teams combined for a 24–21 record, Gray's 1938–39 team posted a 19–6 overall mark and won the Southwest Conference championship outright for UT's first basketball conference title in six years. The season featured the then-most anticipated intersectional matchup in school history, as Phog Allen's Kansas Jayhawks came to Austin. The Jayhawks appeared to be on their way to winning the first game until the Longhorns rallied late in the second half for a 36–34 victory. The second game the following night proceeded more in line with expectations, with Kansas winning handily, 49–35. Following the series against KU, Texas traveled to Oklahoma City to compete for the first time in the All-College tournament, which had begun in 1937. The 1939 edition of the holiday tournament featured 32 teams from the Southwest and Midwest. The Longhorns easily advanced through their tournament bracket, defeating Southeastern State College (Oklahoma), Westminster College (Missouri), Kansas State Teachers College, and tournament favorite Baylor before falling to Central Missouri State Teachers College in the championship game, 33–25. Texas began conference play with an upset loss to the Rice Owls before hosting the Arkansas Razorbacks for two games in Austin. The Longhorns won a close first contest, 41–37, before being thoroughly outclassed in the second, falling 65–41. With Texas reeling—having started 1–2 in SWC play, and hosting no conference games in Austin for the next month—the team's goal of ending the conference championship drought was in peril. The Longhorns began a four-game stretch of conference road games with a win over Baylor in Waco before continuing to Dallas to face the SMU Mustangs, who stood at 5–0 in conference play. Gray praised the Mustangs as "probably the most powerful team in the history of the school," and SMU coach Whitey Baccus confidently announced that his team would dispatch the Longhorns. Instead, Texas handed SMU its first defeat of the conference season, 33–27. The Longhorns defeated the TCU Horned Frogs and the Texas A&M Aggies in their remaining two conference road games before winning all five SWC contests in Austin, concluding with a 66–32 rout of the Aggies. With a nine-game conference winning streak, Texas had finished at 10–2 in SWC play to claim sole possession of the SWC championship. The Longhorns were one of eight teams to qualify for the inaugural postseason NCAA tournament, where they fell 56–41 to the "Tall Firs" of the Oregon Webfoots (later known as the Ducks), the eventual NCAA champion. Texas lost the West Regional third-place game to Utah State, 51–49.

Hopes and expectations for the 1939–40 team were high, as all but one of the key players returned from the previous season's SWC champion and NCAA Tournament squad. Texas opened the season with seven wins by an average of 18 points (and by no fewer than 11), including two wins over the Texas Tech Red Raiders in a home series that marked the first meetings between the two schools in basketball. Gray was intent both upon raising national recognition of the program and upon toughening his team in the early part of the season for the conference slate ahead, and to both ends he sought to involve the Longhorns in intersectional competition against prominent teams in high-profile venues across the country. Ned Irish, director of Madison Square Garden and a pioneer in the promotion of college basketball in the 1930s, had invited Gray's Longhorns to play Manhattan College as part of a doubleheader that included Southern California and Long Island University. The UT Athletic Council agreed to fund the team's trip to New York for the contest, followed by a stop in Philadelphia to play Temple. In front of 18,425 fans, the Longhorns overwhelmed Manhattan by a score of 54–32, earning the praise of the New York sports media and basketball fans for their speed and the accuracy of their one-handed shooting, which Gray had popularized as a player and continued teaching as a coach. Continuing on to Philadelphia, Texas fell 47–37 to Temple, winners of the first National Invitation Tournament two years prior. Having lost one of two road contests against Arkansas and a road game against SMU in overtime, Texas entered the penultimate game of the season at 18–3 and tied at 8–2 in conference play with the preseason conference favorite Rice Owls—a team that the Longhorns had defeated on Rice's home court earlier in the season, 50–46. In front of a raucous pro-Texas crowd of more than 8,000 fans packed into Gregory Gymnasium, the Longhorns suffered a one-point loss to the Owls, 42–41, to see their hopes of winning a second consecutive outright SWC championship dashed and their chances of even sharing the championship greatly diminished. Another painful defeat followed in the final game of the season, as the Longhorns fell to a 10–11 Texas A&M team in College Station, 53–52, on a long running shot from the Aggies' backup center in the final seconds. Texas finished 18–5 with no invitation to a postseason tournament. The Premo-Porretta Power Poll retroactively assigned the 1939–40 Longhorn team a national ranking of No. 17.

After his next two teams combined for a 28–19 overall record and a 12–12 record in conference play, Gray was notified of his acceptance for duty in the Navy in April 1942, four months after the United States had entered the Second World War. Gray's assistant Ed Price had also left for naval service. Longhorn football assistant coach Howard "Bully" Gilstrap was appointed to coach the team for the duration of the war.

Gilstrap as interim head coach (1942–45)

In addition to both coaches, three starters from the 1941–42 team had departed for service in the war. Accordingly, expectations for the 1942–43 Longhorns were low. Despite losses of coaches and players that were projected as insurmountable hardships, Texas defied expectations, winning 13 of its first 16 games. Gilstrap credited Gray and Price with encouragement and advice from afar and his players with a degree of cooperation he said he had not seen before. Gilstrap explained, "There were a lot of things I didn't know about the system, and the boys realized that. They came to the rescue. They've been assistant coaches as well as players. We've just been trying to work it out together." After stumbling on a swing through North Texas late in the season with losses to TCU and SMU, the Longhorns concluded the regular season with victories over the Baylor Bears and Texas A&M to win a share of the SWC championship and qualify for the NCAA tournament for the second time. The Longhorns drew the Tournament co-favorite Washington Huskies for their first game. After falling behind by 13 points in the first half, Texas came back to win 59–55 behind 30 points from John Hargis and 15 from Buck Overall to advance to its first-ever Final Four, where it drew the other Tournament co-favorite, the Wyoming Cowboys. It was then the Longhorns who surrendered an early 13-point lead, as the bigger and stronger Cowboys regrouped to win 58–54, on their way to defeating the Georgetown Hoyas 46–34 for the NCAA championship. Texas finished the season with a 19–7 overall record.

Following the 1943–44 and 1944–45 seasons, in which Gilstrap's Longhorn teams posted overall records of 14–11 and 10–10, respectively, Jack Gray returned as head coach with the end of the Pacific War in August 1945.

Post-war Jack Gray years (1945–51)

Gray took charge of a 1945–46 Texas team that returned only five lettermen—none of whom had ever played under him—and which had very little size, as both forward John Hargis and Robert Summers would be out for the entire season. Little was expected of the Longhorns that season, but Texas managed to win its first seven games. The team's grave liabilities in defense and rebounding against bigger teams were never more evident that year than against defending—and soon-to-be-repeating—national champion Oklahoma A&M (later renamed Oklahoma State University) and its 7'0" All-American center, Bob "Foothills" Kurland. Kurland and the Aggies (later known as the Cowboys) dominated the diminutive Longhorns from start to finish, winning 69–34 in the opening round of the eight-team All-College tournament in Oklahoma City. The Longhorns dropped the second game of the tournament to fellow SWC member Rice, 55–52. The Longhorns opened a new season of SWC play with a road win over TCU. Texas was not expected to fare significantly better in two consecutive games against the towering Arkansas Razorbacks in Fayetteville than it had against Oklahoma A&M. The Longhorns acquitted themselves well in a close loss in the first game, 55–47, but the pre-game prognostications came to fruition the following night, as Arkansas routed Texas 90–63 in the second contest. After having lost four of five games, Texas posted an 8–3 record in its final 11 contests to finish with a respectable mark of 16–7 and a third-place conference finish, significantly exceeding preseason expectations for the undersized 1945–46 team.

Discussions had begun about the projected need to build a larger arena for UT basketball team. Longhorn basketball had grown significantly in popularity under Gray and Gilstrap's guidance. Sellouts had not been particularly common during the war years, but the university was growing rapidly, and if Texas basketball continued to achieve success, a looming capacity problem was clearly foreseeable. Football and basketball were growing in popularity nationwide, and a spending and building boom was expected to take place in athletics departments around the country. No specific plans for basketball took shape at UT, but discussions of a larger gym or arena continued over the next three years.

Returning all but one all but one top player and adding some military veterans and players from the freshman team, Gray's 1946–47 Texas team was thought to have a legitimate chance of winning the SWC championship, along with Arkansas, SMU, and defending SWC champion Baylor. Future Naismith Basketball Hall of Fame member and five-time NBA champion guard Slater Martin and forward John Hargis returned to the team to join guards Roy Cox and Al Madsen, who had returned the previous season. All four men, along with three other of that year's letterwinners, had served in the war. Martin, Cox, and Madsen were dubbed the "Mighty Mice." Though the return of Hargis helped, the Longhorns were again a team not possessed of great size, but they did possess great speed and scoring ability. The Longhorns began the season with four blowout wins, the last and closest coming by a score of 46–34 against the Continental Air Liners of Denver. The game against the Air Liners was the last game Texas would play against a semi-professional team, once a routine component of the nonconference schedule, until the 1955–56 season. Not content to play only overmatched local teams for the remainder of the nonconference slate, Gray wanted to harden his team for the season ahead, and the Longhorns next embarked upon a 10-day, 4,000-mile train trip to face Canisius in Buffalo, Long Island in New York City, and DePaul in Chicago. Texas defeated Canisius 52–46 before traveling to New York for the most-anticipated contest of the trip, the game in Madison Square Garden against Clair Bee's LIU Blackbirds, who were averaging 90 points per game and had recently defeated defending national champion Oklahoma A&M. In front of a strongly pro-LIU crowd of 18,453, the Longhorns upset the Blackbirds, 47–46. Texas next traveled to Chicago to face the DePaul Blue Demons of Ray Meyer, whose team had won the NIT two years earlier, and won the final game of their road trip in a rout, 61–43. Before returning to Austin, the 7–0 Longhorns stopped in Oklahoma City to play in the All-College Tournament. Texas dominated the Missouri Tigers 65–46 before falling to Oklahoma A&M, the two-time defending national champion, in the semifinal by a single point, 40–39. The Longhorns defeated the Oklahoma Sooners in the third-place game the following night by a score of 62–50. Texas was only occasionally challenged during the remainder of the regular season, winning its three remaining nonconference games by 29, 24, and 12 points and seven of its first 10 conference games by 12 or more points (and the first 10 SWC contests by an average of 16.6 points). The Longhorns entered the final weekend of the conference season needing only one win in two games against the second-place Razorbacks. In front of more than 8,000 fans at Gregory Gym, Arkansas led for most of the first game before Slater Martin led a late surge to secure the win and the outright conference championship for Texas, 49–44. The pressure to win the SWC championship thus relieved, the Longhorns easily dispatched the Razorbacks the following night, 66–46, to finish the regular season 24–1 overall and 12–0 in SWC play for their first undefeated conference season since Doc Stewart's 1923–24 team finished 23–0. Texas traveled to Kansas City to face Wyoming in the first game of the NCAA tournament. Four players from each team had been on the 1943 teams that faced off in the Final Four on Wyoming's way to the NCAA championship. Texas trailed until the final minutes of the second matchup, and Martin's long shot with 35 seconds remaining provided the margin of victory, with the Longhorns winning 42–40 to advance to the Final Four for the second time, where they would face Oklahoma. Despite having defeated the Sooners earlier in the season by 12 points, the Longhorns trailed 53–49 in the final minute of their second contest. Texas scored five points to take a 54–53 lead with seconds remaining, but OU scored on a 40-foot shot as time expired to defeat the Longhorns, 55–54. Texas returned to Madison Square Garden to play the City College of New York in the national third-place game prior to the NCAA championship game between OU and Holy Cross (won by the Crusaders, 58–47). Texas defeated CCNY 54–50 to finish the season with 26 wins and two last-second, one-point defeats.

With demand for tickets outstripping the seating capacity of Gregory Gym, calls began to grow louder for the construction of a new arena. At the same time, a group of Austin businessmen announced plans for the construction of a 10,000-seat arena adjacent to soon-to-be-built Interregional Highway, the precursor to Interstate 35, and 23rd Street and East Avenue—plans which ultimately did not bear fruit. During the following season, members of the UT Development Board met with several dozen prominent alumni to discuss plans for the construction of a 20,000-seat coliseum, at a cost of roughly $2 million, to be located south of Memorial Stadium. UT architects had already begun to draw up designs for such an arena, but the effort did not progress beyond the planning stages.

Slater Martin and Al Madsen returned to the 1947–48 Longhorn team, among others, but this team was short on depth compared to the previous season's Final Four team, with only seven players in Gray's rotation. For the first time in six years, freshmen were barred from playing on the varsity team. Texas started the season 6–0—highlighted by a 51–42 win over the Texas Tech Red Raiders and a 51–30 blowout of the LSU Tigers, who proved too slow to handle the speed of another fast and quick Longhorn team—before embarking on another road trip to the Northeast, stopping in New York for the third time in two seasons. In a rematch of the previous season's national third-place game, Texas faced the CCNY Beavers in Madison Square Garden. Texas surrendered an 18-point first-half lead but withstood a late CCNY rally, holding on to win, 61–59. Texas defeated the St. Joseph's Hawks in Philadelphia, 61–57, before returning to Oklahoma City for the All-College Tournament. There the Longhorns defeated the Georgia Tech Yellow Jackets by a score of 54–45 and the Alabama Crimson Tide, 40–31, to advance to the title game against Oklahoma A&M. For the second consecutive year, the Aggies defeated the Longhorns by a single point, 32–31, after Bob Harris again provided the winning margin in the final five seconds. Texas opened conference play 5–0, pushing its overall record to 16–1, before suffering three consecutive losses to Baylor, Rice, and Arkansas to see its prospects for defending its SWC crown dashed. The Longhorns recovered to win the second game against the Razorbacks in their weekend trip to Fayetteville, 54–43, to halt the losing streak. By the time of the Longhorns' next contest, against Baylor, the Bears stood at 11–0 in conference play and had already secured the SWC championship. Although Texas could do no better than second place, more than 8,000 fans squeezed into 7,500-seat Gregory Gym to see the Longhorns hand the Bears their only defeat of the conference season, 32–29, after Al Madsen added a layup and a free throw in the final 20 seconds. The win over Baylor landed Texas an invitation to the 1948 NIT with two conference games remaining. (Baylor would go on to advance to the championship game of the 1948 NCAA tournament, where the Bears fell to Adolph Rupp's Kentucky Wildcats in the first NCAA championship game appearance for either program.) Texas narrowly avoided an upset loss to SMU at home before blowing out Texas A&M in College Station, 54–34, to finish 9–3 and in second place in the SWC play. The Longhorns boarded a train for New York the following morning to face the favored Violets of New York University, led by future fourth overall 1948 draft pick, 16-year NBA star, and Naismith Basketball Hall of Fame member Dolph Schayes. Martin and Madsen led Texas to a 43–39 lead with under four minutes remaining—after Texas had trailed by seven points midway through the second half—but NYU tied the game in the final minute and scored the final basket on a long shot with six seconds remaining to win the quarterfinals game, 45–43. The Longhorns finished the season 20–5, marking the first time in program history that Texas had won 20 or more games in consecutive seasons.

Texas recedes from the national stage (1951–76)

After two losing seasons during the program's first five years, Texas suffered only one losing season from 1912 to 1950, reaching two Final Fours and one Elite Eight during the first decade of the NCAA Tournament. The Longhorns would finish with losing records ten times from 1951 to 1976.

Abrupt decline (1951–59)
Thurman "Slue" Hull was hired as men's basketball head coach prior to the 1951–52 season. In his five seasons as the Texas head coach, Hull led the Longhorns to one Southwest Conference championship (1953–54) and finished with an overall record of 60–58 (.508). He was dismissed following the 1955–56 season after his final two teams produced a combined record of 16–32—easily the worst two-year period in the history of Longhorn basketball to that point. Hull was the first Texas coach since W. E. Metzenthin, who coached the basketball team for three years during the program's first five seasons (1909–11), to finish with a Texas career win percentage below .600.

Following Hull's dismissal, Marshall Hughes was hired as the next men's basketball head coach prior to the 1956–57 season. Under Hughes, the Texas basketball program reached the nadir of its existence. Hughes was fired after only three seasons—each with a losing record, and each worse than the one preceding it—with an overall record of 25–46 (.352) after his final team posted a mark of just 4–20, tying the 1954–55 season as the then-worst in program history and concluding a five-year span of futility in which the Longhorns produced an overall record of 41–78 (.345).

Uneven recovery (1959–67)
Between coaches Harold Bradley, hired as head coach in 1959, and Leon Black, who directed the basketball team from 1967 to 1976, the Longhorns played in four NCAA Tournaments, two under each coach, as a result of winning the Southwest Conference five times (three times outright) in 17 years.

In Bradley's first season, the Longhorns won the SWC outright to reach the 1960 NCAA tournament, where they fell to the Kansas Jayhawks by a score of 80–71 in the Sweet Sixteen contest. Texas subsequently lost the Midwest Regional third-place game to DePaul by a score of 67–61. Texas finished the season ranked No. 13 in the UPI Coaches Poll, marking the first time that the basketball team had finished the season ranked since the introduction of the AP poll and the Coaches Poll for the 1948–49 and 1950–51 seasons, respectively.

Bradley's 1962–63 team again won the SWC outright and reached 20 wins for the first time since Jack Gray's 1947–48 Longhorns. Texas advanced to the NCAA tournament and defeated the Texas Western Miners by a score of 65–47 in its opening game to advance to the Sweet Sixteen, where the Longhorns fell 73–68 to Ed Jucker's defending two-time national champion and fifth-consecutive Final Four participant Cincinnati Bearcats. Texas would go on to win the Midwest Regional third-place game against future Texas head coach Abe Lemons' Oklahoma City Chiefs by a score of 90–81. The Longhorns finished the season ranked No. 12 in the Coaches Poll.

The 1964–65 Longhorns tied SMU for the conference championship but lost the tiebreaker for the conference's NCAA tournament berth and thus did not participate in postseason play. In the following two seasons, Bradley's Texas teams posted overall records of 12–12 and 14–10. Bradley retired following the 1966–67 season. He finished with an overall record of 123–75 (.631) and a conference record of 73–39 (.651) as Texas head coach.

Resumed decline (1967–76)
With the hiring of Leon Black prior to the 1967–68 season, Texas entered a period that saw the reversal of most of its progress since the lost decade of the 1950s. Black opened with three losing seasons and one non-winning season before his 1971–72 team finished 19–9, won a share of the conference championship, and reached the 1972 NCAA tournament. The Longhorns defeated the Houston Cougars 85–74 to advance to the Sweet Sixteen, where they fell to the Kansas State Wildcats by a score of 66–55. (This was the final game of the tournament for Texas, as regional third-place games ceased to be held following the 1967 NCAA tournament.)

After posting a 13–12 overall record in 1972–73, Black's Longhorns recorded three consecutive losing seasons, each with fewer wins and more defeats than the one before. Black's 1973–74 team managed to win the SWC championship outright, even with an overall record of 12–15, and advanced to the NCAA tournament, where the Longhorns fell to the Creighton Bluejays in the first round, 77–61.

Following 10–15 and 9–17 seasons in 1974–75 and 1975–76, respectively, Black resigned from his position as Texas head coach. Black finished with an overall record of 106–121 (.467) and a record of 63–65 (.492) in conference play. Prior to Black, only two Texas head coaches had finished with overall losing records—W. E. Metzenthin (1909–11) and Marshall Hughes (1956–59)—and each had only coached for three seasons. Black coached for nine seasons, only twice finishing with a winning record.

Abe Lemons years (1976–82)

Following Leon Black's resignation, Texas Athletic Director and Longhorn head football coach Darrell Royal selected then-University of Texas-Pan American and former longtime Oklahoma City University head coach Abe Lemons as his primary target for the open position. Lemons and fellow Oklahoman Royal agreed to a five-year contract worth roughly $30,000 per year, and Lemons was subsequently introduced as the twentieth Longhorn head basketball coach in the program's 72 seasons.

Thanks to his exuberant personality, quick and acerbic wit, and rare quote-making skill, the cigar-smoking Abe Lemons' growing status as a fan favorite anticipated any of his notable accomplishments in basketball at Texas. Though he and his staff inherited two players that would play central roles on his most successful Texas teams in freshman forward and Los Angeles high school player of the year Ron Baxter and sophomore Auburn transfer Jim Krivacs, Lemons was nevertheless assuming control of a moribund program coming off of three consecutive losing seasons, the last of which featured the then-third-most defeats in the history of the program. Lemons was less than sanguine about the Longhorns' prospects for the 1976–77 season. Asked in a preseason media session if he felt his first Texas team to be worthy of a top-twenty ranking, Lemons replied, "You mean in the state?" After starting the season with a 6–9 record, Texas managed a six-game winning streak against some of the conference's weaker teams before stumbling to a 1–4 finish over the final five games. Despite Lemons' dejected mood following the final game of the season, a loss to Baylor in the final men's basketball game in Gregory Gymnasium, his first team had posted a four-game improvement in its season record over the 9–17 squad of the prior year, finishing 13–13 on the season.

No significant preseason expectations attended the 1977–78 Texas Longhorns, a team that would produce one of the more successful seasons in Longhorn basketball history. After a one-point loss in the opening game against Southern California in Los Angeles, Texas inaugurated the $37-million, 16,231-seat Special Events Center with an 83–76 victory over the Oklahoma Sooners, the first of eight straight wins. Texas lost 65–56 to fifth-ranked, defending national champion Marquette before posting another nine straight victories, including a 75–69 upset of third-ranked and eventual Final Four participant Arkansas, with its famed "Triplets" (guards Sidney Moncrief, Ron Brewer, and Marvin Delph). The win over Eddie Sutton's Razorbacks vaulted Lemons' Longhorns to a No. 15 ranking in the Associated Press Poll, Texas' first appearance in the poll since a one-week showing at No. 20 in 1949, the inaugural season of the AP basketball poll. Texas would finish the regular season ranked No. 12 in the AP poll with records of 22–4 overall and 14–2 in conference play, sharing the Southwest Conference Championship with the Razorbacks. Despite the impressive season, Texas saw its hopes of playing in the 32-team NCAA tournament dashed in a two-point loss to Houston in the SWC Tournament Final. Houston claimed the automatic bid to the Tournament, Arkansas received an at-large bid, and the Longhorns were left to accept a bid to the 1978 National Invitation Tournament. Texas would storm through the tournament to reach the NIT Championship Game against the North Carolina State Wolfpack, defeating Temple, Nebraska, and Rutgers by an average of over 17 points in the first three rounds. The Longhorns posted an easy 101–93 victory over the Wolfpack to win the NIT Championship behind 22, 26, and 33 points, respectively, from point guard Johnny Moore and 1978 NIT Co-MVPs Ron Baxter and Jim Krivacs. After the end of the 1977–78 season, Abe Lemons was named National Coach of the Year by the National Association of Basketball Coaches. Lemons remains the only men's basketball coach in UT history to earn National Coach of the Year honors.

With its four leading scorers returning, Texas entered the 1978–79 season with a No. 6 ranking in the AP poll and as the near-unanimous favorite to win the SWC championship. The Longhorns struggled early, beginning the season 7–4 and falling out of the AP rankings after a 21-point road defeat to Bill Cartwright and the San Francisco Dons. After another blowout road loss to Texas Tech, Texas regrouped to win three straight road games and 12 of its next 13 games, including a three-point upset of 10th-ranked Arkansas in Fayetteville, a 23-point blowout of Shelby Metcalf's No. 15 Texas A&M Aggies in Austin, and an eight-point win over the 11th-ranked Aggies three weeks later in College Station. During the preceding thirty seasons, Texas had only managed a total of six wins against AP-ranked opponents, and never more than one such victory in a single year. A home loss to 14th-ranked Arkansas was the lone blemish during the 13-game stretch, a game that featured a shouting and shoving episode, famous in SWC lore, between Lemons and Eddie Sutton after Sutton had admonished Texas player Johnny Moore on the court. Police and assistant coaches intervened, but Lemons told the media following the game that if Sutton dared to address his players again, he would "tear his Sunday clothes" and "liquidate his a**." Struggling SMU dealt Texas a shocking defeat in the final game of the regular season, depriving the Longhorns of sole possession of the SWC crown and forcing them to share the conference championship with Arkansas for the second straight season. Following a 39–38 loss to the ninth-ranked Razorbacks in the SWC Tournament Final, Texas received a No. 4 seed and a bye to the second round in the 1979 NCAA tournament. Texas fell to No. 5-seeded Oklahoma in the tournament to finish the season with a 21–8 overall record and a No. 15 final ranking in the UPI Coaches' Poll. The Longhorns drew an average of 15,886 fans per home game in 1978–79, a school and Erwin Center record that to this point has not been challenged.

The 1979–80 Texas Longhorns returned only one starter, forward Ron Baxter. LaSalle Thompson, 6'10" center and future Longhorn great, joined the program as a freshman. Texas ended the regular season with an 18–10 overall record and a 10–6 conference record, finishing third behind Texas A&M and Arkansas in SWC play. Passed over by the NCAA Tournament selection committee, Texas received a bid to the 1980 NIT, the last postseason tournament a Lemons-coached Texas team would reach. The Longhorns posted a 70–61 win over St. Joseph's before falling to Southwestern Louisiana, 77–76, in the second round to finish with a 19–11 overall record. Baxter, the 1980 Southwest Conference Player of the Year, finished his UT career as the then-all-time school leader in both scoring and rebounding.

The 1980–81 Longhorn team carried little in the way of preseason expectations of success. Even before the season began, the program was embroiled in controversy and turmoil. Lemons had summarily fired assistant Steve Moeller, leading to a caustic public feud between the two men, with each blaming the other for recent disappointing recruiting results. Moeller charged that Lemons' lack of inhibition with regard to public and private criticism of players was damaging the program. Only one of the four players signed in the 1981 class—6'9" forward Mike Wacker—was considered a coveted prospect. Texas opened with a home loss to Pacific. The regular season's zenith, a two-point win over Arkansas in Fayetteville on January 12, did nothing to reverse the team's downward trajectory, with losses to TCU, SMU, North Texas, Rice following shortly thereafter. The Longhorns stumbled to a 10–14 overall record with two conference games remaining. Lemons' habitual sarcasm and indiscriminately acid tongue, heretofore endearing to fans if not academic administrators, began to draw criticism, with some citing his routinely quippish comments as evidence that he failed to take his team's poor performance sufficiently seriously. Nonetheless, just as Lemons began to face notable fan frustration and criticism for the first time at Texas, his team began an unexpected run of late-season success. Lemons' team managed to win the two remaining regular season games as well as three of four games in the SWC Tournament—including a 76–73 victory over No. 15 Arkansas in the semifinal round—to avoid finishing with a losing record. The end-of-season success quelled discontent for the time being, with fans and commentators pointing to the return of LaSalle Thompson, Mike Wacker, and a healthier and more experienced supporting cast as reason for renewed confidence about the near future and optimism about the program's prospects.

While his teams' records and performance had declined since the 1977–78 season, Lemons was not thought to be in danger of losing his job as he entered the 1981–82 season, the first year for new Athletic Director DeLoss Dodds and Lemons' last at Texas. Preseason expectations had Texas posting improvement over the prior season, but the 1981–82 Longhorns were nonetheless not expected to challenge for Southwest Conference supremacy. Texas began the season unranked, only entering the January 12 AP Poll at No. 19 after winning the first ten games of the season. Consecutive double-digit wins over No. 10 and eventual Final Four participant Houston at Hofheinz Pavilion and No. 9 Arkansas in Austin vaulted Texas to No. 7 in the following poll. An 88–71 nationally televised win over South Carolina the following week moved Texas to No. 5 in the AP Poll, the then-highest ranking in program history. Keyed by the performance of 1982 All-American, national rebounding champion, and eventual fifth overall 1982 NBA draft pick LaSalle Thompson and the much-improved sophomore forward Mike Wacker, the Longhorns had started the season with a record of 14–0, then the program's finest season start in the NCAA Tournament era. Two weeks and five losses later, the Longhorns would drop from the polls altogether. The loss of Wacker to a devastating knee injury in the first half of a 69–59 loss to Baylor, the Longhorns' first defeat of the year, disrupted the team's on-court chemistry and confidence and ultimately derailed the season. Texas would win only two of its final 13 games, finishing the season with a 16–11 overall record.

On March 9, eight days after the Longhorns' final game, DeLoss Dodds announced Abe Lemons' firing. Dodds was not specific as to the reasons, vaguely citing a "series of incidents from this and past years, along with the need for new leadership and direction." The news met with surprise and outrage from players and fans. Lemons, who, despite some struggles, had presided over the resurrection of Texas basketball during the preceding six seasons, professed shock. Even with the collapse following Wacker's injury, there had been no indications that his job was in jeopardy. Privately, though, Dodds had faced pressure from important administrators and boosters to dismiss the popular Lemons ever since he had arrived at Texas the prior autumn. A powerful faction of UT officials and donors felt that Lemons was presiding over an undisciplined program and that he had become excessively and irresponsibly outspoken. His refusal to enforce a curfew or to punish players for missing practices, for instance, had already drawn criticism in the past. A lack of academic progress during his time at Texas was another reflection of a shortage of discipline and another cause for embarrassment for UT officials. Only one player that Lemons recruited to Austin graduated during his tenure. Moreover, his sharp-tongued and indiscriminate public insults and criticism of people ranging from UT administrators and faculty to officials and coaches at other schools to SWC administrators and referees had progressively earned Lemons the ill will and resentment of a growing number of people with influence over UT athletics. Lemons remained a popular figure among fans, but his support among administrators and powerful donors had dissipated. Following the end of the season, the UT Office of the President and the Board of Regents directed Dodds to fire Lemons, who had two years at $52,000 per year remaining on his contract. The ousted head coach did not leave quietly, commenting that he wanted a glass-bottomed car so that he could see Dodds' face as he ran him over, and adding, "I hope they notice the mistletoe tied to my coattails as I leave town." Despite the acrimonious parting, Lemons would be invited back to reunions in later years and would eventually be inducted into the Longhorn Hall of Honor in 1994.

Lemons finished with an overall record of 110–63 (.636) and a conference record of 58–38 (.604) as Texas head coach.

Bob Weltlich years (1982–88)
Second-year Athletic Director DeLoss Dodds signaled his determination to change the culture of the basketball program, noting that the next Texas head coach would be expected to oversee significant improvements in players' academic progress and off-court discipline and the near-total elimination of contact between players and boosters. Texas players petitioned in support of Barry Dowd, a long-time Lemons assistant, for the vacant coaching position, but Dodds and UT administrators were intent on severing all connections to the Lemons era. Dodds ultimately chose 37-year-old Bob Weltlich, a former assistant coach under Bob Knight at Army and Indiana who came with Knight's recommendation, from the University of Mississippi to serve as the next Texas men's basketball head coach. Dodds and Weltlich agreed to a five-year contract worth $95,000 per year, and Weltlich was introduced as head coach on April 2, 1982. At his first press conference as Texas head coach, Weltlich remarked that "titles are won with good character—and not characters"—a statement many took to be a swipe at the way Lemons had run the program.

Nicknamed "Kaiser Bob" by Longhorn fans for his harshly disciplinarian approach, Weltlich was almost immediately faced with such a manpower shortage from the departures—both voluntary and involuntary—of so many Texas players that he famously had to press Texas male cheerleader Lance Watson into service during the Longhorns' abysmal 6–22 season of 1982–83. LaSalle Thompson, who was considering bypassing his senior season but was as yet undecided at the time Weltlich was hired, ultimately left for the 1982 NBA draft. More than a dozen Longhorn players would leave the program during Weltlich's first three years, and several would make negative comments about his grueling practices and his reliance on criticism and insults as a motivational tactic upon departing. Some players who remained publicly defended Weltlich and his methods. After the new coach's first season, junior forward Bill Wendlandt commented that he believed he had gained mental discipline that he had previously lacked. Nevertheless, even Wendlandt would leave the program after the fall semester of his senior year.

Of the 1982–83 Longhorn team's six wins, only three came against NCAA Division I opponents—two in non-conference play against Harvard and UNC Charlotte, and one in conference play against Rice in Austin, 47–45. The Longhorns' 15 losses in the conference regular season came by an average of 22.5 points. The season witnessed Texas's fourth, fifth, eleventh, and thirteenth most-lopsided defeats ever—a 106–63 loss to the No. 4 Cougars in Houston, a 96–59 defeat to Texas A&M in College Station, a 76–43 defeat at the hands of Baylor in Waco, and an 82–48 loss to TCU in Fort Worth. Following the 34-point loss to the Horned Frogs, Weltlich savaged his players in public comments, calling them "as phony as the day is long." Texas ended the season with losses in 17 of its last 18 games and with a 13-game losing streak. The Longhorns' 6–22 overall record and 1–15 mark in SWC play represent what remain the most total and conference losses incurred in one season in program history.

Weltlich's next three teams posted yearly improvements in overall records, although the 1983–84 Longhorns did so by the margin of a single game over the prior year, finishing the season 7–21. Texas managed four wins against Division I competition, with a 62–61 road win over Utah in non-conference play, to end a 21-game road losing streak, and three wins against conference competition—two against Baylor and one over Rice. The Longhorns were also generally more competitive in their many defeats, with their 13 SWC losses coming by an average of 15.0 points, for a one-third reduction in the average margin of defeat from the previous season. Texas played respectably in two losses to eventual second-consecutive national runner-up Houston, losing by 11 to the No. 7 Cougars in Houston and by the same margin to No. 5 Houston in Austin. After trailing 19th-ranked Arkansas 45–27 at halftime in Austin, Texas narrowed the Razorbacks' lead to 68–66 in the final minute before Arkansas added two final points to secure the win. Nonetheless, the 1983–84 season saw a number of particularly lopsided defeats, with a 103–72 loss to SMU and a 74–47 loss to Texas Tech representing what remain the third- and ninth-worst home losses in program history. As fan criticism of Weltlich began to mount, Dodds professed to be "losing no sleep over basketball at UT" and said, "I don't think there's any question that the direction Bob has taken is the right one. No one expected this to be easy."

Though defections would continue for the remainder of Weltlich's tenure, the pace of the exodus had slowed considerably, and the team's roster began to accumulate a semblance of stability, depth, and experience by the start of his third season as head coach. Weltlich stated before the season began that his third Texas would be "vastly improved" over the previous two. The 1984–85 Longhorn team would more than double the win total of the previous year's team, posting 15–13 overall and 7–9 conference records. The Longhorns were also significantly more competitive in almost every game they played. Texas lost a hard-fought contest to No. 9 LSU in Baton Rouge in the third game of the season, 87–79,  and battled eventual SWC champion SMU closely during the conference season, falling 54–46 to the No. 3 Mustangs in Austin and 64–60 to No. 9 SMU in the second-to-last game of the conference slate. Of the Longhorns' 12 regular-season losses, only two came by margins greater than nine points (with 14 points being the largest margin of defeat). Texas also achieved its first victory over an NCAA Tournament-bound team under Weltlich, defeating Pac-10 Conference champion Southern California in the final game of the regular season, 71–70. The Longhorns were genuinely uncompetitive only in their final game of the year, a 66–46 loss to Arkansas in the SWC Tournament.

The 1985–86 team—which finished with a 19–12 overall record and a share of the SWC championship—marked the zenith of Weltlich's tenure at Texas. The Longhorns posted a 3–2 record in their first five games, losing on the road 67–66 to South Alabama and in an 84–62 blowout at Southern California. After a home win over Oral Roberts, the Longhorns traveled to Norman to face an eighth-ranked and 7–0 Oklahoma. Texas pushed the Sooners to overtime and led 90–89 with 28 seconds remaining, but an OU steal and two subsequent scores led the Sooners to a 93–92 win. Weltlich bemoaned his team's decision-making in the backcourt, commenting in the postgame press conference, "We've lost our last two road games in the last second, and we haven't learned from it." Texas returned from Norman at 3–3 to face faced ninth-ranked and 7–0 LSU in Austin. The Longhorns led 35–28 at halftime, but the Tigers recovered to win, 72–65. LSU head coach Dale Brown described the game as his team's most difficult to date and the Texas team as sound in fundamentals. After two more home wins, Texas traveled to Atlanta to play in the Cotton States Classic. After a 35-point loss to No. 7 Georgia Tech in the opening round—in what remains the second-largest margin of defeat in a neutral-site game in program history—Texas posted its third one-point loss of the season in the consolation game against 20th-ranked DePaul, falling 63–62. The Longhorns had again built and then surrendered an early lead, having opened a 10-point advantage over the Blue Demons in the first half. Texas opened conference play with four consecutive wins, including its first win over Arkansas under Weltlich, before falling 55–54 to the Texas A&M Aggies in College Station. After a 63–56 loss to SMU in Dallas, Texas won eight consecutive conference contests, including a 61–57 win over Arkansas in Fayetteville–Texas's first win at Barnhill Arena since 1981–completing Texas's first season sweep of the Razorbacks since 1974. On February 15, Texas recorded its first sold-out home game since Abe Lemons' final year as head coach in a 58–47 win over Texas A&M. The Longhorns suffered their fifth one-point defeat of the season against TCU in Dallas in their penultimate conference game, falling 55–54 as Horned Frog guard Jamie Dixon scored on an off-balance, 30-foot jump shot at the buzzer. Texas followed up the loss to TCU with its sixth one-point loss of the season—and third out of four total losses in SWC games—against Texas Tech in Austin in the conference finale to surrender sole possession of first place in conference play and ultimately share the SWC championship with TCU and Texas A&M. After a semifinal loss to A&M in the conference tournament, the Longhorns were invited to the 1986 NIT—the Longhorns first postseason appearance under Weltlich, and the first since the 1979–80 season. Texas defeated New Mexico in the first round, 69–66, before falling to eventual NIT champion Ohio State in the second round, 71–65.

The Longhorns opened the 1986–87 season with a one-point loss to No. 17 North Carolina State, 69–68, and an 80–68 loss to Alaska Anchorage. In its third game of the season, Texas stunned No. 2-ranked and defending national champion Louisville, 74–70, the highest-ranked opponent the Longhorns had defeated in school history. The victory presaged little about the season to come, however, as Texas finished 14–17 overall and 7–9 in SWC contests, for its third losing season in five seasons under Weltlich. Six of the Longhorns' seven victories in conference play came by five points or fewer, while six of the nine conference losses came by 10 points or more.

For the first time since the 1974–75 season, Leon Black's second to last as head coach, Texas faced no ranked opponents during the 1987–88 season. Nonetheless, the Longhorns finished 6–6 in non-conference play, losing to all three eventual NCAA tournament participants they faced—falling 100–83 at Iowa State, 80–75 at home to Utah State, and 71–70 at Chattanooga—and losing 86–74 at home to New Mexico, the one eventual NIT participant they faced. Texas suffered its most lopsided non-conference defeat, 85–56, on the road at the hands of a Miami (FL) team that would miss the postseason entirely. Texas posted a 10–6 record in SWC play, tying for fourth place, and lost the first game of the conference tournament to Houston, 72–57. For the fifth time in Weltlich's six seasons, Texas failed to advance to a postseason tournament. Four days after the loss to Houston, Weltlich was dismissed with two years remaining on his contract.

Weltlich compiled a 77–98 (.440) record during six seasons as the head coach at Texas. None of his six teams managed an appearance in the NCAA Tournament; only the 1985–86 team participated in postseason competition, losing in the second round of the NIT. With the combination of poor overall results and an ultra-slow-tempo style of play that fans found unappealing, attendance plummeted from the lofty marks achieved during the tenure of the popular Lemons to an average of barely more than 4,000 fans per game during Weltlich's final season (far below the turnout for Jody Conradt's Lady Longhorns teams at that time).

Tom Penders era (1988–98)
Hired from the University of Rhode Island on April 6, 1988, to replace Weltlich as the Texas head coach, Tom Penders rapidly revitalized the moribund Longhorn basketball program. Months before coaching in his first game at Texas, Penders set about reviving fan enthusiasm for Longhorn men's basketball. He canvassed the state, speaking to every University of Texas alumni chapter and booster club in Texas. Penders called his team the "Runnin' Horns," and he promised an exciting, fast-paced style of play that would stand in stark contrast to the basketball on display during the prior six seasons. Early on, Penders promised Texas fans, "We'll run after made shots, missed shots, turnovers, timeouts, TV timeouts, you name it. We'll run and pressure and play 94 feet of defense."

Unlike his entrance, Weltlich's departure did not result in an exodus of players from the program. Penders' first team returned four starters from the previous season, and two talented transfers—Lance Blanks and Joey Wright—gained eligibility, giving Texas a starting five with three future NBA Draft picks and a fourth starter who would play in the NBA. Penders led his first team to a 25–9 overall record, marking the first 20-win season in ten years at Texas and the then-second-highest win total in school history. He quickly validated his promise to bring high-scoring offense to Texas: in the first nine games of the 1988–89 season, the Longhorns scored more than 100 points five times. In Bob Weltlich's 175 games as head coach, Texas had never scored 100 or more points in a game—and had only scored 90 or more points on four occasions (twice requiring an overtime period to reach that mark). The Longhorns opened the season with an 8–1 record before traveling to Oklahoma City to compete in the four-team All-College Tournament. Texas players openly marveled at the wholesale change in coaching philosophy from prior seasons to one that now encouraged them to shoot in large volumes, and some expressed eagerness to see how they would fare against elite competition with their new style of play. Texas defeated the OSU Cowboys 85–84 in the first contest behind 32 points from sophomore guard Joey Wright and two late free throws from junior guard Lance Blanks, who had transferred from Virginia. The win matched Texas in the tournament final against a high-scoring, sixth-ranked Oklahoma Sooners team only nine months removed from a four-point loss as a prohibitive favorite in the 1988 national championship game. Billy Tubbs' Sooners revealed the distance that remained between Texas and college basketball's elite teams, building a 63–37 halftime lead en route to an easy 124–95 win. Texas won six games in conference play by five or fewer points to finish in second place in the SWC with a 12–4 record, with two losses to Arkansas and one loss apiece to Houston and Texas A&M. Interspersed among the conference contests were games against NCAA Tournament-bound Vanderbilt, which Texas lost by a score of 94–79, and Miami (FL), which the Longhorns won easily, 123–104. Texas defeated both SMU and TCU in overtime in the SWC Tournament to advance to the final, in which Arkansas defeated the Longhorns for the third time in 10 weeks. Texas was subsequently selected as a No. 11 seed to play in the NCAA tournament for the first time in 10 seasons, where the Longhorns would defeat the sixth-seeded Georgia Tech Yellow Jackets, 76–70, for the program's first NCAA Tournament victory since 1972. Texas fell in the second round to the sixth-ranked and third-seeded Missouri Tigers, 108–89, to end the season at 25–9, a nine-win improvement over Weltlich's final season. The Longhorns' on-court success—in combination with Penders' appealing, fast-tempo brand of basketball and his tireless promotion of the Texas program—produced a rise in average home attendance from the prior season of almost 149 percent (from 4,028 to 10,011), the largest such increase in NCAA Division I basketball for the 1988–89 season.

For the 1989–90 season, Texas returned its high-scoring trio of guards, Lance Blanks, 1989 SWC player of the year Travis Mays, and Joey Wright—dubbed "BMW—the ultimate scoring machine" by the Texas sports information department and labeled the third-best set of guards in the country by Dick Vitale. Penders' second team finished 24–9 and qualified for the NCAA tournament for the second straight year—a first in Longhorn basketball history—and for only the second time since the Tournament field expanded to 64 teams. Texas defeated No. 24 Florida in Austin, 105–94, in the fifth game of the season for its first win against ranked competition under Penders. The Longhorns would go on to lose their remaining regular-season contests against ranked opponents—to Shaquille O'Neal, Stanley Roberts, and No. 11 LSU in a neutral-site contest, 124–113; to No. 4 Oklahoma in Norman, 103–84; to No. 6 Arkansas in Fayetteville, 109–100, in a game that saw Mays depart in the first minutes due to a finger injury; and, finally, to No. 3 Arkansas in overtime in Austin, 103–96, in a famously bitter defeat that became known in UT lore as the "Strollin' Nolan" game. The Longhorns led by one point with 14 seconds remaining when Arkansas head coach Nolan Richardson, after an intentional foul call against a Razorback player, slowly walked off the court to the Arkansas locker room. The SWC officiating crew did not assess a technical foul against Richardson for leaving the court—a decision that the NCAA's chief rules interpreter would label a mistake. Nonetheless, Texas appeared to have the game in hand—leading by three, after Blanks made two free throws—until Arkansas's Lee Mayberry, the national leader in three-point field goal percentage, made a contested 30-foot shot with four seconds remaining to tie the game at 86–86 and send the game into overtime. Richardson then returned to the court, eliciting a resounding chorus of boos from the crowd, and Arkansas outscored Texas 17–10 in the overtime period to claim the win. Two losses to Houston left Texas with a 12–4 record and third-place finish in conference play. The Longhorns added wins against Rhode Island—the team Penders had coached before being hired by Texas—and DePaul during the regular season. Against Rhode Island, Travis Mays surpassed Ron Baxter's career scoring total to become the then-leading scorer in UT history. After their third win that season over Texas A&M in the SWC Tournament, the Longhorns would fall to Houston for the third time, 89–86. At 21–8, Texas was awarded a No. 10 seed in the NCAA Tournament. After an easy 100–88 win over the No. 7-seed Georgia Bulldogs, the Longhorns upset Gene Keady's No. 2-seeded Purdue Boilermakers, 73–72, to advance to the Sweet Sixteen for the first time in 18 seasons. With a come-from-behind 102–89 win against the 28–4 Xavier Musketeers—in which Blanks, Mays, and Wright combined for 86 points—Texas advanced to the Elite Eight for the first time in 43 years to face its SWC archrival, the Arkansas Razorbacks, for the third time that season. Trailing by 16 points with 12 minutes remaining, the Longhorns mounted a comeback that fell just short, falling 88–85 as Travis Mays' last-second three-point attempt came off the rim. Mays finished the season as the Southwest Conference's all-time leading scorer, with 2,279 career points. Texas was ranked No. 12 in the post-Tournament Coaches Poll, matching the 1962–63 team for the highest end-of-season poll ranking in program history.

Mays and Blanks having been selected in the first round of the 1990 NBA draft, the Longhorns entered the 1990–91 season without two-thirds of the Elite Eight team's "BMW scoring machine." Even so, Texas received a preseason AP ranking of No. 22, and Penders' third team finished with a 23–9 overall record, advancing to the NCAA tournament and finishing with 23 or more wins for the third consecutive year. After opening with a win over Florida in Gainesville, Texas fell to No. 20 LSU in Baton Rouge, 101–87, and No. 16 OU in Austin, 96–88. Texas remained ranked until losing to No. 17 Georgia in Athens three weeks later. The Longhorns would defeat Steve Fisher's Michigan Wolverines, 76–74, and fall to a Tournament-bound Arizona State team, 89–82, before beginning conference play. After a 101–89 road loss to No. 2 Arkansas, Texas won ten straight games—nine over SWC opponents and one over DePaul—to Texas resurface in the AP Poll for one week in mid-February at No. 24. Penders finally ended both a personal and program seven-game losing streak to Arkansas in the final game of the conference regular season with the Longhorns' 99–86 win over the No. 3 Razorbacks in Austin, which gave Texas a 13–3 record and second-place finish in conference play. Texas would fall to Arkansas six days later in the SWC Tournament final—the last meeting between the Longhorns and the SEC-bound Razorbacks as conference archrivals. Texas nonetheless ended the season ranked No. 23 in the final AP Poll, for the Longhorns' first appearance in the final AP Poll since the 1978 NIT Championship team, and for only the second time in program history. Texas received a No. 5 seed in the 1991 NCAA Tournament, and the Longhorns would advance from the first round for the third consecutive year before falling 84–76 to fourth-seeded St. John's in the second round, which made 61 percent of its shots—and 71.4 percent of its first-half shots—while holding Texas to just 40 percent in field-goal percentage.

While the departure of Arkansas would hasten the demise of the SWC altogether in the longer term, it immediately consigned the conference—one not regarded as a significant player in college basketball for several decades—to virtual irrelevance in the college basketball landscape. Texas would play just three games against ranked conference opponents—all against the same team, and all occurring in the same season—in the remaining five seasons of the league's existence. Houston was the only remaining program that had resided among the nation's elite in recent years, but the Guy Lewis era had ended six years prior, and UH had only advanced to the NCAA Tournament twice—winning no games on either occasion—since its famed "Phi Slama Jama" teams had reached three consecutive Final Fours and two national championship games from 1982 to 1984. Penders' revived Texas program, by default, became the weakened SWC's bell cow, winning or sharing three of the final five SWC championships.

Texas quickly took advantage of Arkansas's absence, as Penders' 1991–92 team finished with a 23–12 overall record, for his fourth consecutive season of 23 or more wins, and a share of the SWC championship. Although Texas had lost leading scorer and eventual second-round NBA draft pick Joey Wright and first-team all-SWC forward and second-leading scorer Locksley Collie to graduation, the Longhorns added transfer guard and eventual first-round draft pick B. J. Tyler and freshman guard Terrence Rencher, a prolific scorer who would receive first-team all-SWC honors as a freshman and hold several program and conference records by the end of his senior year. The Longhorns opened the season with wins over Washington and Princeton in the Preseason NIT in New York City, before falling to No. 18 Georgia Tech and No. 24 Pittsburgh in the semifinal and third-place games by scores of 120–107 and 91–87, respectively. Texas defeated non-conference opponents Clemson and Georgia over the course of the season, but fell to No. 17 Oklahoma in Norman, 109–106; No. 8 Connecticut in Austin, 94–77; unranked UTEP in El Paso, 92–88; unranked LSU in New Orleans by a score of 84–83; and unranked Rhode Island in Providence by a score of 92–79. The Longhorns nonetheless compiled an 11–3 conference record—losing road contests to TCU, Baylor, and Rice—to share the SWC championship with Houston. Texas defeated Texas A&M and Texas Tech in the SWC Tournament to advance to the final against Houston. Despite having won both regular season games against the Cougars, the Longhorns were uncompetitive in a 91–72 loss in their third contest. Texas was subsequently selected as a No. 8 seed in the NCAA tournament. The Longhorns lost to the Iowa Hawkeyes in the opening game by a score of 98–92, marking the only time in eight first-round NCAA Tournament contests under Penders that Texas would fail to advance to the second round.

Following 95 wins in Penders' first four seasons at Texas—with never fewer than 23 wins in a single season—an injury-plagued 1992–93 season saw Texas struggle to an 11–17 overall record and a 4–10 record and seventh-place finish in the eight-team SWC. Point guard B. J. Tyler—a key offensive player both as a scorer and as a facilitator, having averaged 18.3 points and 6.5 assists as a sophomore in 1991–92—would miss the majority of the season. Forward-center Albert Burditt—who led the 1991–92 team in rebounds and blocks—would average 14.9 points, 14.1 rebounds, and 4.2 blocks per contest in the 1992–93 season, but would be limited by injury to playing in only 12 games. Following a 63–53 win over Princeton in the first game in a four-team tournament in Charlotte, North Carolina, the Longhorns suffered one of the most lopsided losses in school history to Dean Smith's No. 7 and eventual national champion North Carolina Tar Heels, 104–68. Texas fell to Utah in Salt Lake City, 87–76, defeated Illinois in Austin, 89–72, and suffered an 85–76 loss to No. 15 Oklahoma in the All-College Tournament before beginning conference play. Texas began 0–4 in SWC play and suffered four home losses among its 10 total conference defeats. In the course of the conference season, the Longhorns lost to unranked non-conference opponents LSU in a neutral-site game, Georgia in Athens, and Virginia Commonwealth (VCU) in Austin by scores of 84–81, 78–70, and 66–60, respectively. Texas defeated Rice in the SWC Tournament before losing to Houston in the semifinals to end the season.

Despite the disastrous 1992–93 season, Texas returned a healthy roster deep with talent and experience for the 1993–94 season. Point guard B. J. Tyler, the future 20th overall pick in the forthcoming 1994 NBA draft, and Albert Burditt, future second-round selection in the 1994 Draft, returned in full health (Tyler after missing the first four games) after each having missed the majority of the previous season. Texas was not ranked in the preseason polls, but the potential for significant improvement was evident. Prior to the beginning of the season, sportswriter Gene Wojciechowski labeled the 1993–94 Longhorns a Final Four candidate, opining that Tyler, Burditt, and Terrence Rencher were the three best players in the SWC. With Tyler still absent, Texas struggled in its first four games, narrowly defeating Nebraska in Lincoln, 78–75, and losing a road contest to LSU and a home game against Florida by scores of 86–66 and 76–68, respectively. The Longhorns' struggles continued, as Texas fell 96–86 to No. 16 Connecticut in Storrs and 86–61 to Rick Pitino's Kentucky Wildcats in Maui to post a 2–4 record in its first six games. Texas won its final game in Maui against Notre Dame before facing Oklahoma in Austin. Against Oklahoma, the Longhorns were finally able to end a nine-game program losing streak (extending back to 1979) and a five-game losing streak under Penders, defeating the Sooners 87–75 in Austin. The Longhorns avenged the previous season's loss to Utah with a 93–91, double-overtime home win over Rick Majerus's Utes before losing a closely contested game at Illinois, 83–78. After losing its first SWC game, Texas won 18 of its next 19 games in the regular season and in winning the SWC Tournament, with its only loss coming in double-overtime to Texas Tech in Lubbock, 128–125, and with its wins coming by an average of 22.1 points (and only once by fewer than 12). The Longhorns finished the SWC Tournament with a 25–7 overall record, a 12–2 conference record and outright SWC championship, and a No. 20 ranking in the final AP Poll. Texas received a No. 6 seed in the NCAA tournament and defeated Western Kentucky by a score of 91–77 to advance to a second-round contest against third-seeded Michigan, national runner-up the preceding two years. The Longhorns lost a close game to the Wolverines, 84–79, who would advance to the Elite Eight before falling to eventual national champion Arkansas, which defeated Michigan by the second-narrowest margin of its six NCAA tournament wins in 1994. Texas finished the season with a 26–8 overall record, matching Jack Gray's 1946–47 Final Four team and Abe Lemons' 1978 NIT Championship team for most wins in program history. Albert Burditt earned first-team all-SWC honors for the 1993–94 season. B. J. Tyler was recognized as the Southwest Conference Player of the Year and became the first Texas men's basketball player to receive All-American honors since LaSalle Thompson in 1982.

Penders resigned on April 3, 1998, following a scandal involving the unlawful release of player Luke Axtell's grades to the media. Longhorn players Axtell, Chris Mihm, Gabe Muoneke, and Bernard Smith had met with Texas Athletic Director DeLoss Dodds "to say that they had lost faith in Penders and his program."

In ten years at Texas, Penders' teams appeared in eight NCAA Men's Division I Basketball Championship NCAA Tournaments, advancing past the first round in all but one appearance. Penders finished as the then-winningest coach (by win total) in program history, with an overall record of 208–110 (.654).

Rick Barnes era (1998–2015)

Hired as the twenty-third men's basketball coach in Texas history on April 12, 1998, Rick Barnes left Clemson University to take over a Texas program coming off of a losing season and "in disarray" following Tom Penders' resignation.

Despite playing with just seven scholarship players for the majority of the 1998–99 season—and opening the season with a 3–8 record—Barnes engineered one of the greatest midseason turnarounds in school history. The Longhorns won 16 of their final 21 games, posting a 13–3 record in conference play and winning the school's first regular season Big 12 Conference championship by a two-game margin. Texas finished the year with a record of 19–13, earning with a No. 7 seed in the NCAA tournament.

In 2002, Texas advanced to the NCAA Sweet Sixteen for the first time since the 1996–97 season, and for only the third time since the expansion of the tournament to 64 participants in 1985. The 2003 Longhorn basketball team matched the school record for most basketball victories in a season with their 26–7 mark and advanced to the NCAA tournament Final Four round for the first time in 56 years, and for the third time in school history. Along the way, Texas earned its highest ranking in school history in both the Associated Press and the ESPN/USA Today polls (No. 2 in both polls on Dec. 2, 2002) and received its first No. 1 seed in the NCAA Tournament. Sophomore point guard T. J. Ford became the first UT male player to earn the Naismith and Wooden Awards as college basketball's National Player of the Year in 2003.

Despite the early departure of Ford to the NBA as the eighth overall pick (Milwaukee Bucks), Texas compiled a 25–8 overall record in 2004 and advanced to the Sweet Sixteen round for a school-record third consecutive year. The four senior starters on the 2004 team graduated as the winningest class in school history (98 wins) to that point. In 2006, the Longhorns recorded the program's first 30-win season (30–7), claimed a share of the Big 12 Conference regular season championship, received a No. 2 seed in the NCAA tournament, and advanced to the Elite Eight (Texas fell to LSU in overtime), marking the fourth time in five years that Texas had advanced to at least the NCAA Sweet Sixteen. The 2006 class, which finished with 101 wins in four years, bested the 2004 class's mark of 98 wins to become the then-winningest class in the history of Longhorn basketball.

The 2005–06 season also marked the hundredth anniversary of basketball at UT. Special logos were placed on the uniforms to commemorate this anniversary.

In 2006, the Longhorns introduced blue-chip recruit and future NBA superstar Kevin Durant to Austin. A recruiting class which included in-state talents such as Damion James and D. J. Augustin helped garner unforeseen levels of hype and scrutiny for the Texas basketball program. Durant's spectacular lone season at Texas resulted in his receiving unanimous National Player of the Year honors. The Longhorns, however, saw their season end at the hands of the USC Trojans in the second round of the 2007 NCAA tournament. Durant became the No. 2 overall pick in the 2007 NBA draft by the former Seattle SuperSonics, and was the 2014 NBA Most Valuable Player with the Oklahoma City Thunder.

In the 2009 NCAA tournament, Texas earned a No. 7 seed in the East Region. The Longhorns defeated the Minnesota Golden Gophers in the first round by a score of 76–62 behind the sharp shooting A.J. Abrams. The Longhorns' season came to a close with a 74–69 second-round loss at the hands of the Duke Blue Devils. The 2009 graduating class finished with 109 wins, besting the 2006 class's mark of 101 wins to become what remains the winningest class in school history.

During the 2009 recruiting cycle, Texas acquired top-tier prospects Avery Bradley and Jordan Hamilton. Partnered with veteran Damion James, center Dexter Pittman and a solid stable of guards, the Longhorns achieved their first-ever No. 1 ranking in 2010, roaring to a 17–0 start. Texas' fortunes turned upside-down with a 71–62 loss on the road to Kansas State and the ensuing 88–74 loss to Connecticut, beginning a 7–10 finish and raising the pressure for Barnes' Texas teams to reach over the hump, a recurring theme in the head coach's final six seasons in Austin. More of the same occurred in 2011, when Texas garnered two elite prospects in Canadians Tristan Thompson and Cory Joseph and had a similar scorching (23–3) start—only to lose the league to Kansas again and fall in the second round of the NCAA tournament to the Arizona Wildcats. Bradley left the program for the NBA in 2010, and Hamilton, Thompson, and Joseph followed suit in 2011.

In the 2012–13 season, Barnes' Longhorns finished 16–18 and missed their first NCAA tournament since 1997–98—the season prior to Barnes' arrival. This began a slow, yet cascading trend by fans and media to replace what had become Texas' winningest basketball coach. Not much change was expected, but turbulence within the Texas athletic department ensued following Dodds' retirement in 2013. New UT Athletic Director Steve Patterson set out to dramatically change the entire Longhorn program, with the resignation of popular football coach Mack Brown following the 2013 football season. Fans and media began to speculate that Barnes' job was at similar risk; even in recruiting—seen as Barnes' specialty—the program could not capture much of the elite Texas talent that had begun to emerge in recent seasons.

After a 2013–14 season in which the Horns defied very low expectations by finishing with a 24–11 record, tying for third place in the Big 12, and reaching the NCAA tournament, Barnes was named Big 12 Coach of the Year, and calls for his job tempered again. The 2014–15 season began with raised expectations from Longhorns fans and media, especially with the signing of top-ranked Dallas-area center Myles Turner. The Horns were ranked as high as No. 6 in the AP and coaches polls, yet only managed to finish sixth in the Big 12 in a very competitive season of conference play. The 20–14 Longhorns' loss to Butler in the opening round of the NCAA tournament marked the final game coached by Barnes at the university. After declining to meet Patterson's demand that he fire his assistants in order to save his job, Barnes was removed from his post as head basketball coach in late March.

Shaka Smart era (2015–2021)
After many days of deliberation and speculation over who would fill Barnes' post, which included names such as Wichita State coach Gregg Marshall (who was heavily courted by Alabama), Villanova coach Jay Wright, and Virginia's Tony Bennett, Texas reached an agreement with Virginia Commonwealth head coach Shaka Smart on April 2, 2015. Smart was introduced as the 24th Texas men's basketball head coach the following day at a press conference in Austin.

The Longhorns finished 20–13 in Smart's first season, including a fourth-place finish in the Big 12 Conference. The scheduled included the school's first-ever basketball game in China - a 77–71 loss to Washington. Point guard Isaiah Taylor returned to lead the team in scoring for the second straight season, averaging 15 points per game. The Longhorns struggled at times in the season after center Cameron Ridley went down with an injured foot that caused him to miss all of conference play, returning for a brief stint in the conference tournament and in Texas' NCAA tournament game. Texas won four of its last six regular season games, including a 76–63 win over a top-five Oklahoma team in Austin, but lost in the first round of the Big 12 Conference tournament to Baylor, 75–61. In the first round of the NCAA tournament, the Longhorns lost, as a half-court shot off the backboard lifted Northern Iowa to a 75–72 win.

In 2017, the Longhorns went 11–22, finishing with their most losses since the 1983 season. Texas struggled with consistency early in the season, but after leading scorer Tevin Mack was suspended in January, the Longhorns went 4-12 the rest of the way, including seven straight losses to end the regular season. Mack, a sophomore guard, left the team and transferred to Alabama. Freshman center Jarrett Allen led Texas the rest of the way, averaging 16 points and almost 10 rebounds in Big 12 Conference play. Allen declared for the NBA draft after the season, and the Brooklyn Nets selected him with the 22nd pick of the first round.

Under Smart, the Longhorns' recruiting situation improved dramatically, with players such as Matt Coleman, Andrew Jones, Mo Bamba, Jaxson Hayes, and Greg Brown standing out for the team during that time. Texas made the NCAA tournament in 2018, losing to Nevada in the first round, followed by an NIT win in 2019. The 2019–20 season was seen as a failure until a late-season rally by the Longhorns, which arguably saved Smart's job, along with the COVID-19 pandemic which canceled the NCAA tournament that year.

In 2020–21, the Longhorns won their first Big 12 tournament title, following a strong showing in a regular season marred by COVID-19 cancellations (including the Longhorns' own semifinal against Kansas). After defeating Oklahoma State for the Big 12 title, Texas suffered arguably its most infamous loss in school history, as the third-seeded Longhorns fell, 53–52, to 14th-seeded Abilene Christian in the first round of the NCAA tournament. Smart, under duress, decamped for Marquette on March 26.

Chris Beard era (2021–2023)
On April 1, 2021, Texas Tech head basketball coach Chris Beard accepted the head coaching position at Texas. Widely considered the top candidate from the moment Smart departed, Beard is a 1995 alumnus of the University of Texas and served as student manager under Tom Penders during his time on campus.

In Beard's only full season of coaching at the school, Texas managed 22 wins and an NCAA appearance, which ended in the second round at the hands of Purdue. The 2022–23 'Horns started strongly at 7−1 before Beard was suspended in December for allegations of domestic violence.

On January 5, 2023, Beard was fired as head coach amid a felony domestic violence charge, which was later dropped.

Rodney Terry as interim coach (2022−2023)
Rodney Terry, Beard's top assistant, was given the reins on an interim basis for the remainder of the season. Terry guided a senior- and transfer-heavy Longhorn team to a second-place Big 12 finish, behind perennial conference power Kansas. Silver linings in Terry's interregnum included an emphatic 75−59 victory over the Jayhawks in the final regular season game, which portended the team's eventual performance in the 2023 Big 12 tournament. 

Texas would defeat Kansas in the tournament final to clinch an automatic bid in the NCAA tournament, the second time in three years this has occurred and the first tournament final win over Kansas in school history. (Surprisingly, Rick Barnes' popular and successful Longhorn teams of the 2000s never beat Kansas in the Big 12 tournament and only made the finals six times in his tenure -- including three losses in a row to the Jayhawks).

Facilities

Clark Field (1906–12, 1914–16)

Clark Field, originally known as Varsity Athletic Field, was an on-campus, outdoor stadium that was the original home of the Texas Longhorns men's basketball team, as well as the Longhorn football, baseball, and track teams. The stadium opened in 1887. In its final years, the facility held 20,000 spectators.

The Texas Longhorns men's basketball team moved indoors to the new Men's Gym in 1917.

Ben Hur Temple (1913)

Head coach Carl C. Taylor, seeking an indoor home venue for the basketball team, reached an agreement with the Ben Hur Temple in downtown Austin to rent the building's theater for basketball games and five hours of practice weekly for the 1913 season for $75. The building was originally constructed in 1872 as an opera house for the Turnverein, a German gymnastics, social, and cultural society, and it had been purchased in 1912 by the Shriners and Scottish Rite Masons. Basketball goals were mounted on the balcony and in front of the stage, boundary lines were drawn on the double-layer pine floor, and bleachers were erected on each side of the diminutive court, bringing seating capacity to roughly 350 people, including spectators in the balcony and on the stage.

Due to the insufficient size of the court and capacity of the theater, the off-campus location, and the added expense of renting the facility, the basketball team returned to its outdoor home at Clark Field for the 1914 to 1916 seasons.

Men's Gym (1917–28)

The university constructed the Men's Gym adjacent to Clark Field to serve as the temporary home of the Texas men's basketball team pending the construction of a permanent gymnasium. Built for a total cost of $8,500, the all-wood Men's Gym measured 115' by 105' and 23' high and featured a pinewood floor, an electric scoreboard, and seating for 2,500 spectators.

The Texas men's basketball team played home games in the Men's Gym beginning with the 1917 season through the end of the 1927–28 season. On March 25, 1928, the Men's Gym caught fire and burned to the ground. While the loss of the Men's Gym advanced the timeline for the construction of a new gymnasium for men's basketball, the team would be left without an on-campus home for the following two seasons, playing instead in the gymnasiums of the Texas School for the Deaf and Austin High School before moving into the new Gregory Gymnasium for the 1930–31 season.

Texas School for the Deaf and Austin High School Gymnasiums (1928–30)

For the 1928–29 season, the university reached an agreement with the Texas School for the Deaf for the Texas men's basketball team to play its home games in TSD's recently constructed fieldhouse. The TSD fieldhouse had a seating capacity of just one-sixth of the Men's Gym, precluding the sale of tickets to the general public and requiring the use of a lottery for the allocation of tickets to students and existing season ticket holders.

Prolonged inclement weather delayed the completion of Gregory Gymnasium, originally intended to debut in the 1929–30 season with the Southwest Conference opening home game against Baylor, and, consequently, the Longhorns had to play home games away from campus for the entirety of the season. Texas played its nonconference games in the TSD Gym before moving into the recently completed 1,500-seat Austin High School Gymnasium for its five SWC home games.

Gregory Gymnasium (1930–77)

Originally built in 1930, Gregory Gymnasium was named after its main advocate and planner, Thomas Watt Gregory. An alumnus of the university, Gregory served on the university's Board of Regents and as United States Attorney General (1914–19) before the gym was built. Gregory Gymnasium is located on the UT central campus, a short distance southeast of the UT Main Building, Tower, and Main Mall and facing west onto Speedway Avenue, the campus's central north–south street.

The Texas men's basketball team played home games in Gregory Gymnasium beginning with the 1930–31 season until moving into the Special Events Center (later renamed the Frank Erwin Center) for the 1977–78 season.

Frank Erwin Center (1977–2022)

The Texas men's basketball team opened the Frank Erwin Center on November 29, 1977, with an 83–76 victory over the Oklahoma Sooners. The Longhorns won their first 25 games in the Erwin Center before falling to Arkansas in February 1979.

Built for a total cost of $34 million, the building is named for former UT alumnus and Board of Regents member Frank Erwin. Originally known as the Special Events Center, the facility was renamed in 1981 to honor Erwin, who had died earlier that year. The Erwin Center is located at the southeastern corner of the UT central campus and is bounded on the east by Interstate 35.

A two-level layout (the lower arena and upper mezzanine) currently accommodates up to 16,540 spectators for basketball games. UT undertook extensive renovations of the facility from 2001 to 2003 at a cost of $55 million, adding, among other things, new and renovated seating, new video and sound systems, new lighting, and 28 suites. As part of the project, UT constructed the Denton A. Cooley Pavilion, a state-of-the-art practice and training facility that sits adjacent to the Erwin Center.

The master plan released in 2013 for the university's new Dell Medical School indicated that the Erwin Center would be demolished in a later phase of construction within 6–15 years. In 2022, the Erwin Center was replaced by the Moody Center

Moody Center (2022–Present)

Moody Center is a $375M, 15,000+ seat premier venue featuring over 150 nights a year of unique entertainment. Moody Center features the best and biggest names in the music industry while hosting The University of Texas Women’s and Men’s basketball games, family shows and other sporting and local events.

Denton A. Cooley Pavilion practice and training facility (2003–2022)

Built during the final phase of the renovation of the Erwin Center, the Denton A. Cooley Pavilion opened in the fall of 2003. The two-level, 44,000-square-foot building sits adjacent to the Erwin Center and serves as a state-of-the-art practice and training facility for the Texas men's and women's basketball teams. The Pavilion is named for Dr. Denton A. Cooley, a UT alumnus, basketball letterman (1939–41), and pioneering heart surgeon.

The Texas men's and women's basketball teams have separate 9,000-square-foot practice court areas, each consisting of one full-court and one half-court practice area with seven basket stations. The practice facility also includes a locker room with a players' lounge, an instructional film theater, a 4,100-square-foot strength and conditioning area, an athletic training and hydrotherapy area, an academic resource and activity center, and a coaches' lounge and locker room.

The Cooley Pavilion will be demolished and replaced during the same phase of construction of the Dell Medical School as the Erwin Center. As with the Erwin Center, no decisions have been made as to the location or features of the replacement basketball practice and training facility.

Coaching records

Championships

National championships

Conference championships

Invitational tournament championships

Postseason

NCAA tournament results
Texas has appeared in the NCAA tournament on 36 occasions (tied for 11th-most appearances all time, and second only to Kansas among Big 12 Conference members). The Longhorns' overall record in the Tournament is 38–39.

*Following the introduction of the "First Four" round in 2011, the Round of 64 and Round of 32 were referred to as the Second Round and Third Round, respectively, from 2011 to 2015.

NCAA tournament seeding history
The NCAA began seeding the Tournament in 1979. Texas has appeared in 30 of the 42 seeded Tournaments (and in 29 of the last 32).

NIT results
The Longhorns have appeared in the National Invitation Tournament (NIT) five times. Their combined record is 11–3. Texas won the NIT Championship in 1978 and 2019.

CBI results
The Longhorns have appeared in the College Basketball Invitational (CBI) one time. Their record is 0–1.

Polls

AP and coaches polls

Texas has been ranked in at least one of the final AP or coaches polls in 19 seasons since their introduction prior to the 1948–49 and 1950–51 seasons, respectively. The Longhorns have recorded five top-ten finishes and two top-five finishes in one or more of the final polls. Ten of Rick Barnes' teams, five of Tom Penders' teams, two of Abe Lemons' teams, and two of Harold Bradley's teams finished the season ranked. As of November 27, 2018, Texas teams have been ranked in 252 of 1168 total weekly AP Polls (21.6%) since the inception of the poll in the 1948–49 season (37th all-time in AP Poll appearances), and in 295 of 1153 total weekly coaches polls (25.6%) since the inception of the poll in the 1950–51 season.

Premo-Porretta Power Poll (pre-1949)

Texas has been ranked in the retroactively assigned Premo-Porretta Power Poll rankings in 11 seasons from the 1906 season through the 1947–48 season, the final season before the introduction of the AP Poll. Five Longhorn teams were ranked among the top-ten teams in their respective years, and three Texas teams received top-three rankings. Texas was selected as the poll's national champion for the 1932–33 season.

All-time series records

All-time series records against Big 12 members
Texas men's basketball leads the all-time series against all Big 12 Conference opponents but Kansas (which leads 31–8), Kansas State (21–15), and Oklahoma (54–39).

In series against conference opponents since the advent of the Big 12, Texas trails only KU (which leads 27–7) and KSU (16–15).

All-time series records against former Big 12 members
Texas men's basketball leads the all-time series against all former Big 12 Conference opponents but Missouri (which leads 13–12).

Texas holds a winning record against all former Big 12 members in games played in Big 12 competition.

All-time series records against non-Big 12 former SWC members
In series against former Southwest Conference members who are not current members of the Big 12, Texas trails only Arkansas (which leads 87–68).

In contests against these opponents since the dissolution of the Southwest Conference, Texas holds the lead against all opponents but Southern Methodist, whom the Longhorns have not played since joining the Big 12. The Longhorns hold the advantage against every opponent in the last five games played and all opponents but Arkansas in the last ten games played against each respective opponent.

Records against all other collegiate opponents

*As of November 13, 2018

Rivalries

Big 12 rivals

Oklahoma Sooners
With the formation of the Big 12 Conference in 1996, the Oklahoma Sooners became the Longhorns' main rival in basketball. Texas and Oklahoma are not traditional rivals in any sport other than football, due to their prior residence in different conferences (UT in the Southwest Conference and OU in the Big Eight Conference); nonetheless, the two basketball programs had already compiled a significant series history prior to formation of the Big 12, having met 14 times from 1947 to 1957, 11 times from 1986 until the beginning of Big 12 competition in 1997, and at various other times in the programs' histories. The Sooners entered the Big with a 29–13 lead in the all-time series, having won 10 of the 11 games played from 1986 to 1996. In the Big 12, the competitiveness of the Texas and OU basketball programs—which are second and third in all-time Big 12 regular season conference wins, respectively—only accelerated the development of the basketball rivalry.

The Texas Longhorns and the Oklahoma Sooners play one game in Austin and one game in Norman each year during the regular season. Oklahoma leads the overall series 54–39; Texas leads 26–25 in games played since the inception of the Big 12. Texas has held the upper hand in recent years, winning 23 of 35 meetings from 2003 to 2018.

Kansas Jayhawks
Rick Barnes' tenure also coincided with the emergence of a rivalry between Texas and the Big 12 Conference's traditional national basketball powerhouse, the Kansas Jayhawks. Under Rick Barnes, the Longhorns emerged as Kansas's most consistent competition for Big 12 Conference supremacy. From the inception of the Big 12 through February 18, 2018, Texas has produced a 223–139 mark against conference competition during the regular season, trailing only Kansas's record of 299–63.

The first decade of the 2000s saw the peak of this new rivalry, with the Longhorns at one point trailing Kansas only 5–7 in games played over an almost-nine-season period, and with many of the contests being closely contested classics. Since the beginning of the 2008–09 season, Texas has been less competitive both nationally and in the rivalry, trailing Kansas 2–15 in games played since that time.

Texas and Kansas played one game during the regular season until the 2011–12 season, when the two schools began meeting twice per year. Kansas leads the overall series 30–8 and has won 26 of the 33 contests since the Big 12 was formed. Current KU head coach Bill Self is 20–6 in games against Texas since becoming the Jayhawks' head coach prior to the 2003–04 season.

Baylor Bears
The Longhorns' series with the Baylor Bears has featured more games played than any other UT basketball series; it is also the conference series most lopsided in UT's favor, with the exception of the Longhorns' series against former Southwest Conference opponent Rice and the much more abbreviated series against former Big 12 member Nebraska. Texas leads 162–90 in the overall series with Baylor.

The intensity of the in-state rivalry has grown sharply in recent years with Baylor's emergence as a nationally competitive program under current head coach Scott Drew. Through the end of the 2008–09 regular season, Texas held a 25–3 record against Baylor in Big 12 competition and a 24–0 record against the Bears under Rick Barnes. In games played since the 2009 Big 12 conference tournament semifinals, Baylor holds a 15–7 edge over Texas.

Texas Tech Red Raiders
Texas and Texas Tech have played at least twice yearly since the 1957–58 season. The Longhorns and the Red Raiders play one game in Austin and one game in Lubbock each year during the regular season.

At the time that UT and Texas Tech entered the Big 12, Texas Tech held a 49–45 lead in the all-time series against Texas. Longtime Red Raider coach Gerald Myers' teams dominated the Longhorns for much of the 1970s and 1980s, with the only interlude of Longhorn success occurring during the six-year tenure of Abe Lemons (1976–82), who finished 8–4 against the Red Raiders. By the time Tom Penders became the Texas head coach prior to the 1988–89 season, Texas Tech held a 43–32 lead in the series. Penders narrowed Texas Tech's lead to 50–49 during his tenure (1988–98). During Rick Barnes' 17 seasons as head coach (1998–2015), the Longhorns posted a 33–4 record against the Red Raiders, for a period of dominance unequaled at any other point in the series.

Texas currently leads the overall series 86–57 and has won 41 of the 49 contests since the formation of the Big 12.

Oklahoma State Cowboys
The formation of the Big 12 led to the development of a competitive rivalry between Texas and the Oklahoma State Cowboys, two programs that had already compiled a significant series history despite their residence in different conferences since OSU's departure from the Southwest Conference following the 1924–25 season. Between 1941 and 1979, Texas and OSU met 32 times, with the Cowboys winning 21 of the meetings. At the time of the formation of the Big 12, OSU held a 24–19 lead in the all-time series.

The rivalry reached its peak in the early years of the Big 12, above all when the tenures of Rick Barnes and Eddie Sutton coincided at the two schools, a time when both programs were nationally prominent. From the 1999–2000 season through the 2004–05 season, at least one of the two teams was ranked in 13 of 14 total contests, and both teams were ranked at the time of eight of the 14 meetings. In recent years, the rivalry has declined in intensity as both programs have receded from the national spotlight.

Texas and Oklahoma State have played at least twice yearly since 1997, the first Big 12 basketball season. The Longhorns and the Cowboys play one game in Austin and one game in Stillwater each year during the regular season. Texas currently leads the overall series 49–43 and holds a 30–19 lead in games played in Big 12 competition.

Other rivals

Arkansas Razorbacks
Texas and Arkansas shared a bitter rivalry in basketball—stoked by the mutual enmity that characterized their primary rivalry in football—throughout most of the existence of the Southwest Conference. Until Arkansas' departure for the Southeastern Conference after the 1990–91 season, the Longhorns and the Razorbacks had played at least twice—and often three times—each year since the 1924 season. Texas and Arkansas each won or shared 22 SWC championships (nine more than the nearest competitor, SMU)—although Texas claimed seven of these in the years before Arkansas established its basketball program in 1924 and in the years after Arkansas left the conference.

The Texas–Arkansas basketball rivalry was particularly competitive in its first quarter-century, and both programs enjoyed substantial overall success during this time, with each appearing in two Final Fours and one Elite Eight with the beginning of the NCAA Tournament in 1939 through the end of the 1940s. Arkansas led the series 29–25 over this span.

Both Texas and Arkansas faded from national significance with the end of the 1940s. From the 1949–50 season through the 1975–76 season, Arkansas won only two SWC championships, made only a single NCAA Tournament appearance, and posted an overall record of 312–338 (.480). Texas fared modestly better during this time, winning seven SWC championships, making four NCAA Tournament appearances, and posting an overall record of 342–323 (.514). The Longhorns and Razorbacks split their conference series during this period, with each winning 29 games.

The rivalry grew especially heated from the mid-1970s onward as both schools' athletic departments poured additional resources into their basketball programs, both for coaching hires and for facilities, each seeking to revive programs that had receded from the national stage over the preceding quarter-century. While both Texas and Arkansas appeared to be on the verge of establishing nationally competitive programs with the hires of Abe Lemons and Eddie Sutton, respectively, only Arkansas managed to achieve sustained success in the following years, winning at least 20 games in 13 seasons from 1977 to 1991, with Sutton (1974–85) and Nolan Richardson (1985–2002) each reaching a Final Four and an Elite Eight. (Richardson would lead the Razorbacks to two more Final Fours and a national championship after Arkansas' departure from the SWC.) Arkansas dominated the series over this final phase of the SWC rivalry, winning 27 out of 37 games played during this period.

Arkansas led the series 85–64 upon leaving the SWC; the Razorbacks currently lead the all-time series 87–68, with Texas having won four of the six games played since Arkansas joined the SEC.

Texas A&M Aggies

Before the Texas A&M Aggies' departure for the Southeastern Conference at the end of the 2012 academic year, Texas and Texas A&M had played at least twice (and up to four times) yearly since 1917. During their concurrent membership in the Big 12, the Longhorns and the Aggies played two games during the regular season, with the venue alternating between the home courts of each school. Texas leads the overall series 137–86.

By the time the Big 12 was formed, the in-state rivalry was at a low ebb. The Longhorns had won 18 of the previous 21 contests against the Aggies, dating back to the 1987–88 season. Texas continued to dominate the series in Big 12 play, winning 15 of the first 16 contests between the schools in their new conference. By the time the Aggies hired Billy Gillispie prior to the 2004–05 season, the lopsided nature of the series—and the lack of Aggie fan interest in a program that had gone ten consecutive years without a winning season or postseason appearance under prior coaches—had long since diminished the stature of the once-heated rivalry.

With the rejuvenation of the Texas A&M basketball program under Billy Gillispie (2004–07) and Mark Turgeon (2007–11), the basketball rivalry between Texas and Texas A&M quickly intensified. The Aggies successfully defended their home court from Gillispie's first year through the 2009–10 season, Mark Turgeon's second-to-last season with A&M. The Longhorns defeated the Aggies in all three games in Turgeon's final season and in both games in Billy Kennedy's first season with the Aggies. Texas is 12–7 against Texas A&M since Gillispie was hired in 2004.

The rivalry will be renewed when Texas joins A&M in the SEC no later than 2025.

Individual honors, awards, and accomplishments

Honors, awards, and accomplishments by player

The individual honors, awards, and accomplishments listed in the succeeding subsections are aggregated by player in the following table. Players with only all-conference honors (other than conference player of the year), lower than first-team All-America honors, or later than second-round draft positions are not included.

Naismith Basketball Hall of Fame

Slater Martin is the only Longhorn men's basketball player to have been inducted into the Naismith Memorial Basketball Hall of Fame in Springfield, Massachusetts. Martin was inducted on May 3, 1982.

Retired numbers

Three Longhorn men's basketball players have had their Texas jersey numbers retired: Slater Martin, T. J. Ford, and Kevin Durant.

The primary requirement for the retirement of a UT student-athlete's number is that the individual have won a widely recognized National Player of the Year award. Former UT Athletic Director DeLoss Dodds stated that an exception was made in the case of Slater Martin because, as a Naismith Basketball Hall of Fame inductee, he was a legend in the sport of basketball but had competed before any of the widely recognized awards were established (the Sporting News Men's College Basketball Player of the Year was established in 1943, but it was not awarded from 1947 to 1949).

National honors and awards (players)

National Player of the Year

T. J. Ford and Kevin Durant are the only Texas players to win one or more of the widely recognized National Player of the Year awards. Ford won the Naismith Trophy and the Wooden Award—as well as four of the other eight widely recognized awards—in 2003 as a sophomore. Durant was the unanimous national player of the year in 2007 as a true freshman, winning all 10 awards. Durant was the first freshman ever to win any of the National Player of the Year awards.

Bob Cousy Collegiate Point Guard of the Year Award

The Bob Cousy Award is awarded annually by the Naismith Memorial Basketball Hall of Fame to the top point guard in NCAA Division I men's basketball. The award was presented for the first time following the 2003–04 college basketball season (the season following T. J. Ford's departure to the NBA). D. J. Augustin is the only Longhorn to win the Bob Cousy Award.

Perry Wallace Most Courageous Award
The Perry Wallace Most Courageous Award is the men's version of the USBWA Most Courageous Award, presented annually by the United States Basketball Writers Association to one or more individuals (not necessarily players) who, in the organization's words, have "demonstrated extraordinary courage reflecting honor on the sport of amateur basketball." First presented in 1978 as a single award, separate men's and women's awards were first presented in 2010. The award's bifurcation by sex or gender does not reflect that of the recipient, but is instead based on whether the recipient was involved with the men's or women's game. This award was originally not restricted to college basketball, but every recipient since 1980 has been associated with the college game. The men's award was renamed in 2021 in memory of Wallace, the first African American to play basketball in the Southeastern Conference. Andrew Jones is the first Longhorn to receive this award; he shared 2022 honors with Justin Hardy, a player at NCAA Division III Washington (MO). Both averaged double figures in scoring for their respective teams in 2021–22 while battling cancer (leukemia for Jones, stomach cancer for Hardy).

All-America honors

Twenty Texas basketball players have received All-America honors on 26 occasions; six have been recognized as All-Americans in two different seasons. Seven Longhorns have received consensus first-team All-America honors, and three others have received consensus second-team All-America honors. Thirteen Texas players have received first-team All-America honors in 14 seasons, with one Longhorn player having been selected as a first-team All-American twice.

Conference honors and awards (players)

Conference Player of the Year

Texas players have won conference player of the year honors on ten occasions—eight times in the Southwest Conference and twice in the Big 12 Conference. Two Longhorn basketball players won SWC player of the year honors twice. Three Texas players have won Big 12 Defensive Player of the Year honors.

First-team all-conference honors

Seventy-two Texas men's basketball players have received first-team all-conference honors on 96 occasions. Of these 72 players, 18 have received first-team all-conference honors in two seasons, and three players have received them in three seasons.

First-team All-Southwest Conference

First-team All-Big 12 Conference

Freshman Player of the Year

Eight Longhorn freshmen men's basketball players have won conference freshman of the year honors—three players in the Southwest Conference and five players in the Big 12 Conference.

Southwest Conference Freshman of the Year

Big 12 Conference Freshman of the Year

Conference tournament most valuable player

Five Longhorn men's basketball players have won conference tournament most valuable player honors—four players in the Southwest Conference tournament and one player in the Big 12 Conference tournament.

Southwest Conference tournament Most Outstanding Player

Big 12 Conference tournament Most Valuable Player

Professional basketball

NBA draft history
As of July 30, 2021, 48 Longhorn men's basketball players have been selected in the NBA draft in the history of the program. Of these, 19 were selected in the first round, and 13 were selected in the second round. Among Big 12 programs, Texas trails only Kansas (33) in the number of players drafted in the first round all-time.

Since 1997, Texas has had 23 players drafted overall; of these, 15 were drafted in the first round. Among Big 12 programs, Texas trails only Kansas (34 picks overall, 22 first-round picks) in the numbers of players drafted overall and in the first round during this period. The 15 Longhorn players drafted in the first round from 1997 to 2021 exceed the all-time numbers of first-round picks at each Big 12 school but Kansas.

NBA players

As of February 27, 2023, 38 Texas players have played in the NBA in league history. Of these, 20 played at Texas under Rick Barnes. Nine Longhorn players currently play in the NBA.

All-time NBA players

Current NBA players

Non-NBA professional players

All-time non-NBA professional players

Current non-NBA professional players

 James Banks III (born 1998), Israel Basketball Premier League
 J'Covan Brown (born 1990), Israel Basketball Premier League

Olympians

Four Longhorn men's basketball players have competed in the Olympic Games in men's basketball on six occasions, with three players winning gold medals.

Kevin Durant was the leading scorer on the United States men's basketball team that won the gold medal in the 2012 Olympics. Durant's 156 total points during the Olympic tournament set a record for most points scored by an American basketball player in Olympic competition, surpassing the record previously set by Spencer Haywood in the 1968 Olympics by 11 points. Durant also set the U.S. record for most made three-point shots in an Olympic competition with 34 (on 65 attempts). In addition to leading the U.S. team in scoring, he finished second on the team in rebounding, first in blocked shots, and second in steals.

In the 2016 Olympics, Durant again led the U.S. men's team in scoring with 155 total points—one point fewer than his U.S. Olympic record from 2012—and in minutes played. He finished second on the team in steals, third in assists, and fourth in rebounding. Durant converted 25 three-point shots on only 43 attempts (.581).

Coaching honors and awards

National Coach of the Year honors

Abe Lemons (1976–82) won the NABC National Coach of the Year award following his second season at Texas, a season that saw the Longhorns finish 26–5, win a share of the Southwest Conference title, and win the 1978 NIT Championship. Texas had finished just 9–17 two years earlier in Leon Black's last season as head coach.

Rodney Terry was named Sporting News National Coach of the year for the 2022–23 season, becoming the first Texas coach to win the award since it was introduced in 1964.

John R. Wooden Legends of Coaching Award

The Wooden Legends of Coaching Award is a lifetime achievement award established prior to the 1998–99 season. Selection for the award depends upon a number of on- and off-court factors, from coaching success and philosophy to evidence of good character to graduation rates. Rick Barnes won the Wooden Legends of Coaching Award following the 2008–09 season.

Conference Coach of the Year honors

Abe Lemons was recognized as the Southwest Conference Coach of the Year for the 1977–78 season, the season that saw him win the NABC National Coach of the Year award. Tom Penders received Southwest Conference Coach of the Year honors in 1994 and 1995, and Rick Barnes was named Big 12 Coach of the Year in 1999, 2003, 2008, and 2014.

District-level Coach of the Year honors

Rick Barnes won recognition as NABC District 9 Coach of the Year in five seasons (1999, 2001, 2003, 2008, 2014). Barnes was also a four-time recipient of USBWA District VII Coach of the Year honors (1999, 2001, 2003, 2011).

Records

Team records include single-season, single-game, and NCAA Tournament records for the Texas program. Program records for individual players include career totals and averages as well as single-season totals and averages.

All records are current as of the end of the 2014–15 season.

Team records

Single-season records
Games
 Longest Winning Streak: 23 (1923–24, entire season)
 Longest Winning Streak (Conference): 20 (1923–24, entire season)
 Longest Losing Streak: 15 (Dec. 4, 1954 to Feb. 3, 1955)
 Longest Losing Streak (Conference): 12 (Jan. 24, 1983 to Mar. 5, 1983)
 Most Games Played: 38 in 2007–08 (31–7)
 Most Wins: 31 in 2007–08 (31–7)
 Fewest Wins1: 4 in 1954–55, 1958–59  (4–20)
 Most Wins Without a Loss: 23 in 1923–24
 Most Losses: 22 in 1982–83 (6–22)
 Fewest Losses: 0 in 1913–14 (11–0), 1914–15 (14–0), 1915–16 (12–0), 1923–24 (23–0)
Scoring
 Most Points Scored: 3,205 in 1988–89 (34 games)
 Highest Scoring Average Per Game: 94.3 in 1988–89 (34 games)
 Highest Average Scoring Margin: +14.9 in 2005–06 (75.2 to 60.3)
 Fewest Points Scored2: 1,179 in 1949–50 (24 games)
 Lowest Scoring Average Per Game2: 46.8 in 1950–51 (1,264 in 27 games)
 Lowest Average Scoring Margin2: −12.8 in 1954–55 (−306 in 24 games)
 Most Field Goals Made: 1,173 in 1991–92 (35 games)
 Most Field Goals Attempted: 2,537 in 1991–92 (35 games)
 Highest Field Goal Percentage: .507 in 1984–85 (745 of 1,468)
 Most 3-Point Field Goals Made3: 309 in 2007–08 (38 games)
 Most 3-Point Field Goals Attempted3: 800 in 2007–08 (38 games)
 Highest 3-Point Field Goal Percentage3: .389 in 2006–07 (308 of 792)
 Fewest Field Goals Made2: 445 in 1949–50 (24 games)
 Fewest Field Goals Attempted2: 1,180 in 1952–53 (21 games)
 Lowest Field Goal Percentage2: .329 in 1951–52 (458 of 1,394)
 Fewest 3-Point Field Goals Made3: 309 in 2007–08 (38 games)
 Fewest 3-Point Field Goals Attempted3: 800 in 2007–08 (38 games)
 Lowest 3-Point Field Goal Percentage3: .389 in 2006–07 (308 of 792)
 Most Free Throws Made: 722 in 1989–90 (33 games)
 Most Free Throws Attempted: 996 in 1989–90 (33 games)
 Highest Free Throw Percentage: .768 in 1968–69 (436 of 568)
 Fewest Free Throws Made4: 289 in 1949–50 (24 games)
 Fewest Free Throws Attempted5: 417 in 1972–73 (25 games)
 Lowest Free Throw Percentage: .570 in 1982–83 (302 of 540)
Defense
 Fewest Points Allowed (since 1947–48): 1,079 in 1947–48 (25 games)
 Fewest Points Allowed (since 1985–86): 1,905 in 1985–86 (31 games)
 Lowest Scoring Average Per Game Allowed (since 1947–48):
 Lowest Scoring Average Per Game Allowed (since 1985–86): 60.3 in 2014–15 (2,049 in 35 games)
 Fewest Field Goals Allowed (since 1947–48): 367 in 1947–48 (25 games)
 Fewest Field Goals Allowed (since 1985–86):
 Fewest Field Goals Attempted Allowed (since 1947–48):
 Fewest Field Goals Attempted Allowed (since 1985–86):
 Lowest Field Goal Percentage Allowed2: .325 in 1951–52 (431 of 1,328)
 Fewest 3-Point Field Goals Allowed:
 Fewest 3-Point Field Goals Attempted Allowed:
 Lowest 3-Point Field Goal Percentage Allowed: .295 in 2010–11 (162 of 550)
 Most Points Allowed: 2,983 in 1991–92 (35 games)
 Highest Scoring Average Per Game Allowed: 87.7 in 1988–89 (2,981 in 34 games)
 Most Field Goals Allowed: 1,149 in 1988–89 (34 games)
 Most Field Goals Attempted Allowed:
 Highest Field Goal Percentage Allowed:
 Most 3-Point Field Goals Allowed:
 Most 3-Point Field Goals Attempted Allowed:
 Highest 3-Point Field Goal Percentage Allowed:
 Most Turnovers Forced6: 784 in 1993–94 (34 games)
 Highest Turnovers Forced Average Per Game6:
 Fewest Turnovers Forced6:
 Lowest Turnovers Forced Average Per Game6:
 Highest Turnover Margin6: +8.2 in 1994–95 (14.3 to 22.5)
 Lowest Turnover Margin6:
Rebounds
 Most Rebounds: 1,498 in 2005–06 (37 games)
 Highest Rebounding Average Per Game: 48.1 in 1970–71 (1,154 rebounds in 24 games)
Assists
 Most Assists7: 568 in 1993–94 (34 games)
 Highest Assists Average Per Game7: 17.0 in 1978–79 (493 assists in 29 games)
Blocks
 Most Blocked Shots8: 265 in 2014–15 (34 games)
 Highest Blocked Shots Average Per Game8: 7.79 in 2014–15 (34 games)
Steals
 Most Steals8: 453 in 1993–94 (34 games)
 Highest Steals Average Per Game8: 13.32 in 1993–94 (34 games)
Personal Fouls
 Most Personal Fouls: 783 in 1988–89 (34 games)
 Highest Personal Fouls Average Per Game: 24.1 in 1995–96 (747 fouls in 31 games)
Turnovers
 Fewest Turnovers9:
 Most Turnovers9:

1Since 1914–15, the program's first season in the SWC.
2Since 1949–50 season.
3Since 1986–87 season.
4Since 1932–33 season.
5Since 1960–61 season.
6Since 1972–73 season.
7Since 1978–79 season.
8Since 1979–80 season.
9Since 1972–73 season.

Single-game records
Longest Game
 Most Overtimes: 4 at TCU, Jan. 7, 1961 (L 94–95)
Scoring
 Most Points: 148 vs. Northern Montana, Nov. 27, 1978 (W 148–71)
 Most Points Scored in a Road Game: 136 at Oral Roberts, Dec. 1, 1992 (W 136–97)
 Most Points Scored in a Half: 74 (both halves) vs. Northern Montana, Nov. 27, 1978 (148–71)
 Largest Margin of Victory: 101 vs. San Marcos Baptist, Jan. 10, 1916 (102–1)
 Largest Margin of Victory in a Road Game: 63 vs. Southwest Texas, Feb. 15, 1913 (70–7)
 Most Points Scored in a Loss: 125 at Texas Tech, Feb. 20, 1994 (125–1282OT)
 Largest Margin of Defeat: 50 at No. 1 UCLA, Feb. 20, 1915 (65–115)
 Largest Margin of Defeat in a Home Game: 36 vs. Arkansas, Jan. 20, 1945 (38–74)
 Fewest Points Scored1: 29 at Texas A&M, Jan. 31, 1951 (L 29–32) and Jan. 16, 1959 (L 29–73)
 Most Points, Both Teams: 253 at Texas Tech, Feb. 20, 1994 (L 125–1282OT)
 Fewest Points, Both Teams:
 Most Field Goals Made: 56 vs. Northern Montana, Nov. 27, 1978 (W 148–71)
 Most Field Goals Attempted:
 Highest Field Goal Percentage2: .694 at Tulsa, December 19, 1959 (25 of 36)
 Highest Field Goal Percentage in a Half3: .800 at Arkansas, Jan. 24, 1983 (12 of 15, 1st half)
 Fewest Field Goals Made4: 4 vs. Arkansas, March 10, 1936 (L 16–27)
 Fewest Field Goals Attempted5: 34
 Lowest Field Goal Percentage: .184 at TCU, Feb. 12, 1951 (9 of 49)
 Lowest Field Goal Percentage in a Half:
 Most 3-Point Field Goals Made6: 18 vs. Kansas State, Jan. 12, 1997
 Most 3-Point Field Goal Attempts6: 40 vs. Baylor, Jan. 3, 1998; vs. DePaul, Jan. 26, 1995
 Highest 3-Point Field Goal Percentage (minimum 10 attempts)6: .769 vs. DePaul, Jan. 19, 1991 (10 of 13)
 Fewest 3-Point Field Goals Made6: 0, seven times (last at UC Santa Barbara, Dec. 18, 1990)
 Fewest 3-Point Field Goal Attempts6: 0 at TCU, Feb. 24, 1988
 Lowest 3-Point Field Goal Percentage (minimum 10 attempts)6: .056 vs. Oklahoma State, Feb. 9, 2003 (1 of 18)
 Most Free Throws Made: 40 vs. Baylor, Mar. 7, 1991; vs. Texas A&M, Feb. 22, 1955
 Most Free Throw Attempts: 50 vs. Baylor, Mar. 7, 1991; at Texas A&M, Jan. 12, 1954; vs. Oral Roberts, Dec. 8, 1987
 Fewest Free Throws Made: 2 vs. Baylor, Mar. 14, 2014; vs. Kansas, Jan. 19, 2013; at UCLA, Dec. 2, 2007; at Providence, Dec. 31, 1996; vs. SMU, Jan. 23, 1985; vs. Rice, Jan. 28, 1981; at South Carolina, Dec. 23, 1980
 Fewest Free Throw Attempts: 3 vs. Rice, Jan. 28, 1981
 Highest Free Throw Percentage (minimum 10 attempts)6: 1.000 at Mississippi, Dec. 2, 1972 (16 of 16); vs. SMU, Jan. 20, 1996 (14 of 14); at Oklahoma, Feb. 6, 2008 (11 of 11)
 Lowest Free Throw Percentage (minimum 10 attempts): .263 at Texas A&M, Jan. 4, 1977 (5 of 19)
Defense
 Most Turnovers Forced8: 36 vs. Southwest Texas, Dec. 7, 1994
 Fewest Turnovers Forced8:
 Highest Turnover Margin8:
 Lowest Turnover Margin8:
Rebounds
 Most Rebounds3: 70 at Oral Roberts, Dec. 1, 1992
 Fewest Rebounds3: 15 vs. Rice, Feb. 10, 1985; vs. San Diego State, Dec. 20, 1983
 Most Offensive Rebounds3:
 Most Defensive Rebounds3:
 Highest Rebound Margin3: +39 vs. Samford, Nov. 16, 2005 (54–15)
Assists
 Most Assists9: 37 vs. Northern Montana, Nov. 27, 1978
 Fewest Assists9: 2 vs. Nevada, Mar. 17, 2005
Blocks
 Most Blocked Shots10: 13 vs. UTSA, Dec. 29, 2004; vs. California, Nov. 15, 2000
Steals
 Most Steals10: 22 vs. TCU, Mar. 12, 1994; vs. Baylor, Feb. 15, 1994
Personal Fouls
 Most Personal Fouls3: 38 at Nebraska, Jan. 3, 1996; at Louisville, Dec. 9, 1995
 Fewest Personal Fouls3: 5 vs. TCU, Feb. 3, 1948
Turnovers
 Most Turnovers8:
 Fewest Turnovers8:

1Since 1949–50 season.
2Since 1959–60 season.
3Since 1965–66 season.
4Since 1932–33 season.
5Since 1961–62 season.
6Since 1986–87 season.
7Since 1960–61 season.
8Since 1972–73 season.
9Since 1978–79 season.
10Since 1979–80 season.

NCAA Tournament records
Scoring
 Most Points: 102 vs. Xavier, 1990
 Largest Margin of Victory: 21 vs. North Carolina State, 2006; vs. UNC Asheville, 2003
 Most Field Goals: 36 vs. Iowa, 1992
 Most Field Goals Attempted: 79 vs. Oklahoma, 1979; vs. DePaul, 1960
 Highest Field Goal Percentage: .610 vs. Indiana State (30 of 49), 1988
 Most 3-Point Field Goals Made: 13 vs. Miami (FL), 2008; vs. Iowa, 1992
 Most 3-Point Field Goals Attempts: 31 vs. Iowa, 1992
 Highest 3-Point Field Goals Percentage (min. 10 attempts): .733 vs. Princeton (11 of 15), 2004
 Most Free Throws Made: 31 vs. Xavier, 1990
 Most Free Throws Attempted: 45 vs. Georgia, 1990
 Highest Free Throw Percentage (min. 10 attempts): .962 vs. New Mexico State (25 of 26), 2007
Rebounds
 Most Rebounds: 52 vs. Connecticut, 2003
 Highest Rebound Margin:
Assists
 Most Assists: 25 vs. Western Kentucky, 1994
Blocks
 Most Blocked Shots: 9 vs. Oakland, 2011
Steals
 Most Steals: 16 vs. Michigan, 1996

Individual records

Career leaders
Totals

1 Since 1986–87 season.
2 Since 1972–73 season.
3 Since 1979–80 season.
4 Since 1979–80 season.
5 Assist numbers missing for 12 games for Dan Krueger.

Averages

1 Minimum 500 points.
2 Since 1949–50 season. Minimum 600 points.
3 Minimum 200 attempts.
4 Minimum 450 rebounds.
5 Since 1975–76 season.
6 Since 1979–80 season.
7 Since 1979–80 season.
8 Minimum 100 attempts.

Single-season leaders
Totals

1 Since 1986–87 season.
2 Since 1972–73 season.
3 Since 1979–80 season.
4 Since 1979–80 season.

Averages

See also
 Texas Longhorns women's basketball

Notes and references

External links